= Line 18 =

Line 18 may refer to:

== China ==
- Line 18 (Beijing Subway)
- Line 18 (Chengdu Metro)
- Line 18 (Chongqing Rail Transit)
- Line 18 (Guangzhou Metro)
- Line 18 (Shanghai Metro)

== Other countries ==
- Line 18 (São Paulo Metro), a proposed line in Brazil
- Line 18, part of the Green Line (Stockholm Metro), in Sweden
- Line 18 (Zürich), or Forch Railway, in Switzerland
- Paris Metro Line 18, an under construction line in France
- Sinsen Line, Line 18 of the Oslo Tramway, in Norway

== See also ==
- List of public transport routes numbered 18
