= Route 18 =

Route 18 may refer to:

- One of several highways - see List of highways numbered 18
- One of several public transport routes - see List of public transport routes numbered 18
