= Maharajalela station =

Monorail station in Kuala Lumpur, Malaysia

MR3 Maharajalela
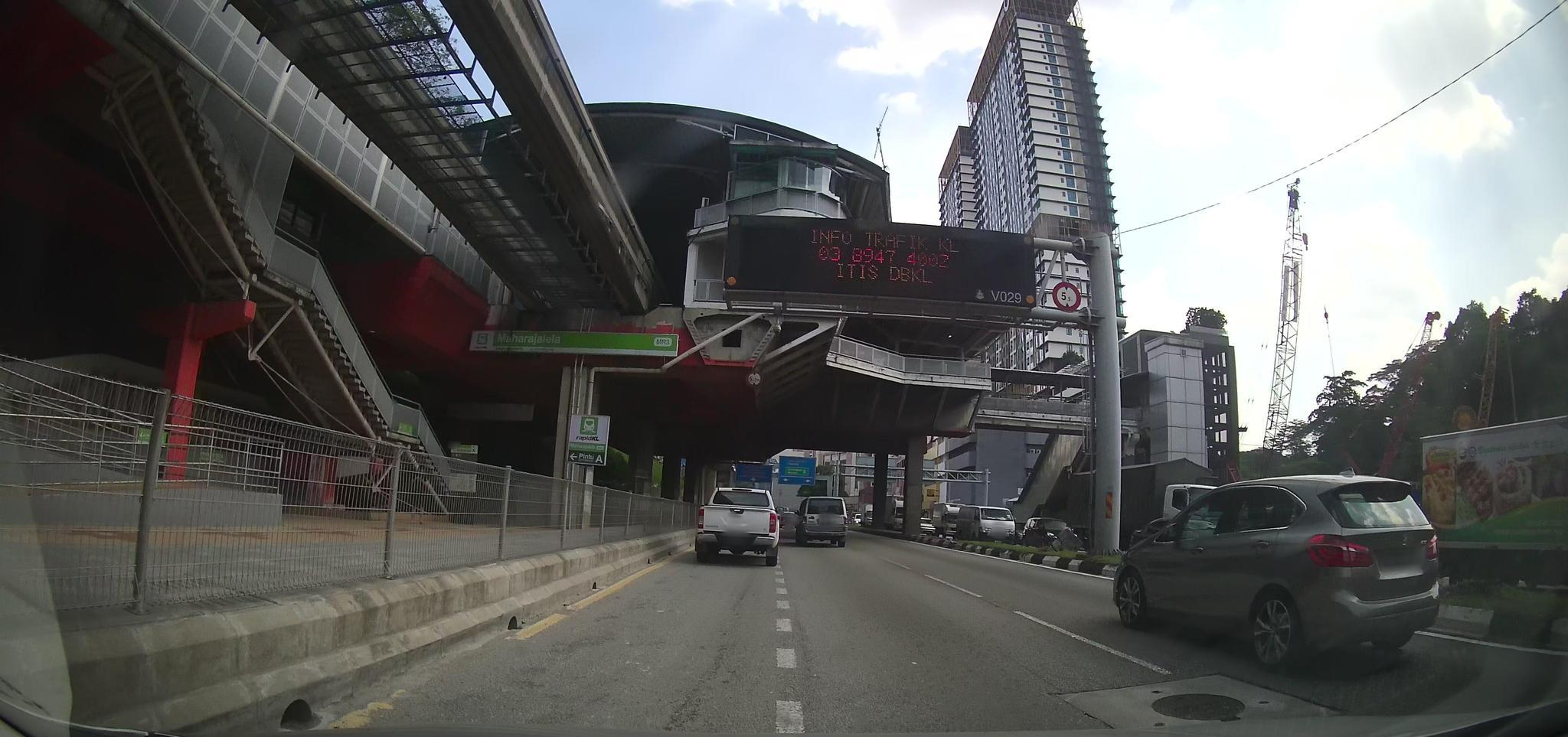
- Maharajalela station

General information
- Other names: Malay: مهاراجليلا (Jawi); Chinese: 马哈拉惹里拉; Tamil: மகாராஜாலேலா
- Location: Jalan Maharajalela, Kampung Attap; 50150 Kuala Lumpur; Malaysia
- Coordinates: 3°8′20″N 101°41′56″E
- System: Rapid KL
- Owner: Prasarana Malaysia
- Operator: Rapid Rail
- Line: 8 KL Monorail
- Platforms: 2 side platforms
- Tracks: 2

Construction
- Structure type: Elevated
- Parking: Not available
- Cycle facilities: Not available
- Accessible: Available

Other information
- Station code: MR3

History
- Opened: 31 August 2003; 23 years ago
- Former names: Merdeka

Services
Preceding station		Following station
Tun Sambanthan towards Kuala Lumpur Sentral	KL Monorail	Hang Tuah towards Titiwangsa
Location

Maharajalela station is a Malaysian elevated monorail train station that forms a part of the Kuala Lumpur Monorail (KL Monorail) line located in Kuala Lumpur and opened for train service on 31 August 2003.

The station is named after and was constructed over the southeast-bound lane of Jalan Maharajalela (English: Maharajalela Road), just southwest from Stadium Merdeka, Merdeka 118 Tower and several hundred metres south from old Kuala Lumpur, including Petaling Street (several stations along the Kelana Jaya Line, Ampang Line and Sri Petaling Line, however, are significantly closer to or are within the area). The station is located along a stretch of monorail tracks laid along Jalan Maharajalela, between the track's turnoff into Jalan Imbi, and another turnoff into Jalan Sultan Sulaiman. This station was formerly called Merdeka station. (Not to be confused with Merdeka MRT station on the Kajang Line on the opposite end of the Merdeka 118 complex)

== Layout ==
L2	Station Platform Level	Side platform
L2	Station Platform Level	Platform 1 8 KL Monorail towards MR11 Titiwangsa (→)
L2	Station Platform Level	Platform 2 8 KL Monorail towards MR1 KL Sentral (←)
L2	Station Platform Level	Side platform
L1	Station Concourse	Faregates, Ticketing Machines, Monorail Station Control, Concourse Staircase Linkway, Unpaid Area Escalator to/from Street Level. Entrance B
G	Street Level	Jalan Maharajalela, Shops, Taxi Lay-by, Pedestrian Crossing. Entrances A & C

=== Exits and Entrances ===
The station has three exits, with two leading to either side of Jalan Maharajalela at the northern and southern points, and one at the northeast side of the station leading into a car park of Stadium Merdeka and Merdeka 118 tower.

KL Monorail station
Entrance	Destination	Picture
A	Street level access. Jalan Maharajalela, Chinatown; Escalator up only.	
B	Direct access to Stadium Merdeka and Merdeka 118 complex	
C	Street level access. Jalan Maharajalela, Kampung Attap, Sunway Belfield service apartments. Escalator up only.	

== Around the station ==
- Merdeka 118
- 118 Mall
- Merdeka Textile Museum
- Stadium Negara
- Stadium Merdeka
- Sunway Belfield
