= Scomi =

Scomi Group Berhad
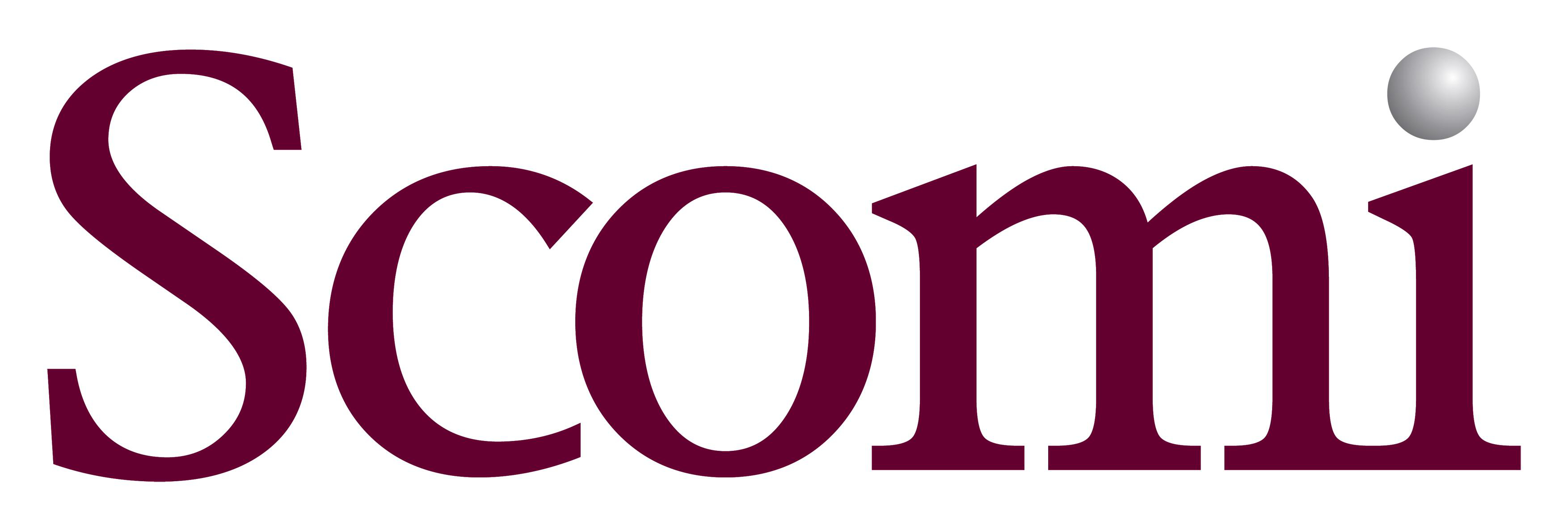
- Type: Public limited company
- Traded as: MYX: 7158
- ISIN: MYL7158OO008
- Industry: Oil and Gas, Public Transportation
- Headquarters: Selangor, Malaysia
- Key people: Kamaluddin Abdullah, Shah Hakim Zain, Sammy Tse Kwok Fai, Ma. Alexandra Krizza Hataman CEO
- Products: Construction, Manufacturing, Shipping
- Revenue: ▲MYR 1,971,000,000 (2009)
- Net income: ▲MYR 9,900,000 (2009)
- Number of employees: Over 9000 in 60 locations in 29 countries
- Subsidiaries: Scomi Engineering Bhd; Scomi Rail; Scomi Energy Services Bhd; PT Rig Tenders (Indonesia)
- Website: scomigroup.com.my

Scomi Group Berhad is a global service provider that is based in Selangor, Malaysia and is mainly involved in oil, gas, transport engineering and marine transportation.

Listed on the main board of Bursa Malaysia, its group of companies are involved in oilfield services, public transportation and marine services. The group offers drilling fluids (DF) and related engineering services, drilling waste management (DWM) solutions, distribution of oilfield products and services, marine vessel services, machine shop services, transport engineering products involving special purpose vehicles, rail wagons, monorail vehicles and buses, supply of industrial and production chemicals and carbon dioxide (CO_{2}) separation. The group was founded in 1961 and operates across 48 locations in 22 countries.

== Activities ==
The company provides oilfield drilling fluids and drilling waste management services and also supplies monorail projects through its Scomi Rail subsidiary. Other companies under Scomi Group listed on Bursa Malaysia Securities Berhad are Scomi Marine Berhad and Scomi Engineering Berhad.

Other companies in the Scomi group include Scomi Oilfield Limited (Bermuda), Scomi Oiltools Limited (Bermuda), Scomi Capital Limited (Labuan), Scomi International Private Limited (Singapore), Scomi Ecosolve Limited (British Virgin Islands).

The company's subsidiaries and associate companies are involved in:

- oilfield services, which comprises integrated drilling fluids and drilling waste management solutions; OCTG machine shops and distribution of oilfield products and services
- transport, which comprises rail, monorail and buses for the transportation sector and special purpose vehicles for the aviation, health, defense, commercial and rescue services
- energy logistics, which provides marine vessels for the coal and oil and gas industry
- production enhancement, which comprises industrial and production chemicals division; and gas business, which mainly provides gas processing equipment.

== History ==
The Scomi Group has its roots in Subang Commercial Motor Industries (S.C.O.M.I.) incorporated in 1990.

In 2000, Scomi was acquired by Kaspadu Sdn Bhd a company controlled by Shah Hakim Zain and Kamaluddin Abdullah.

When the founders of the company took over Subang Commercial Motor Industries, the main motivation for the acquisition was the coach building business. Eventually, the drilling fluids business became the main business for the group, which led to its listing on the then second board of Bursa Malaysia. In 2004, it bought a 71% stake in Oiltools International Ltd to expand its oil and gas business.

Not long after that it took over jewellery company Habib Corp Bhd, which would later become Scomi Marine, and it entered into a RM1.3bil deal to buy vessels from Chuan Hup and stakes in CH Offshore Ltd and PT Rig Tenders Indonesia. The company moved its engineering division into the listed shell corporation of Bell & Order Bhd, which later became Scomi Engineering in 2006.

In 2007, Scomi Engineering bought Mtrans, a bus and monorail operator, for RM25mil. At that time, Scomi's major shareholder was Datuk Kamaluddin Abdullah, son of former prime minister Abdullah Ahmad Badawi.

In 2024, Scomi Energy Services Bhd announced plans to cancel more than 99% of its share capital.

== Monorail ==
Scomi Rail was a subdivision that developed monorail systems, as the company sought to diversify its business lines.

In 2019, Scomi Rail was placed in receivership and it is no longer selling its monorail system.

Operating monorail systems using Scomi:

- KL Monorail Developed by Scomi Transport Systems
- Mumbai Monorail (Opened in February 2014, work began in January 2009)

Other monorail projects involving Scomi:

- Jakarta Monorail (project cancelled after work had commenced)
- Manaus Monorail, in Brazil (contract signed in 2012 with Scomi but construction was not started)
- Putrajaya Monorail (work suspended in 2014, as of 2020 the local government is seeking interest to revive the project)
- São Paulo Metro Line 17 Gold, in Brazil, connecting inner city Congonhas airport to several conventional rail metro lines and the district of Morumbi. Scomi contract cancelled in 2019 for non-performance, awarding to BYD instead.

== Research ==
Typically, monorails carry fewer passengers than a LRT or MRT. Following research and development, Scomi announced a monorail with an eight-car configuration, versus the current four-car configuration for the monorail in Mumbai. This monorail can carry 1,000 passengers, the same as a six-car LRT.

Scomi Engineering ploughs back some 20% of its revenue into research and development on trains. The next-generation monorails it is building is called Gen 3.0 and would be the size of a LRT wagon.

It is also evaluating the prospect of going into trains, where it can build LRTs or EMU (electrical multiple units), which is the kind of trains KTM uses for commuter service.

== Awards ==
The company was awarded the GreenTech Environment Excellence Silver Award 2009, by New Delhi's GreenTech Foundation. Scomi was declared the winner of the award under the engineering sector for raw materials consumption and products manufactured for buses and coaches which contributed to the protection of the environment and surrounding community.

Scomi won the Industry Excellence Award 2008 given by the Malaysian Ministry of International Trade and Industry for its performance in exports.

== See also ==
- List of oilfield service companies
