= Tun Sambanthan station =

Monorail station in Kuala Lumpur, Malaysia

MR2 Tun Sambanthan
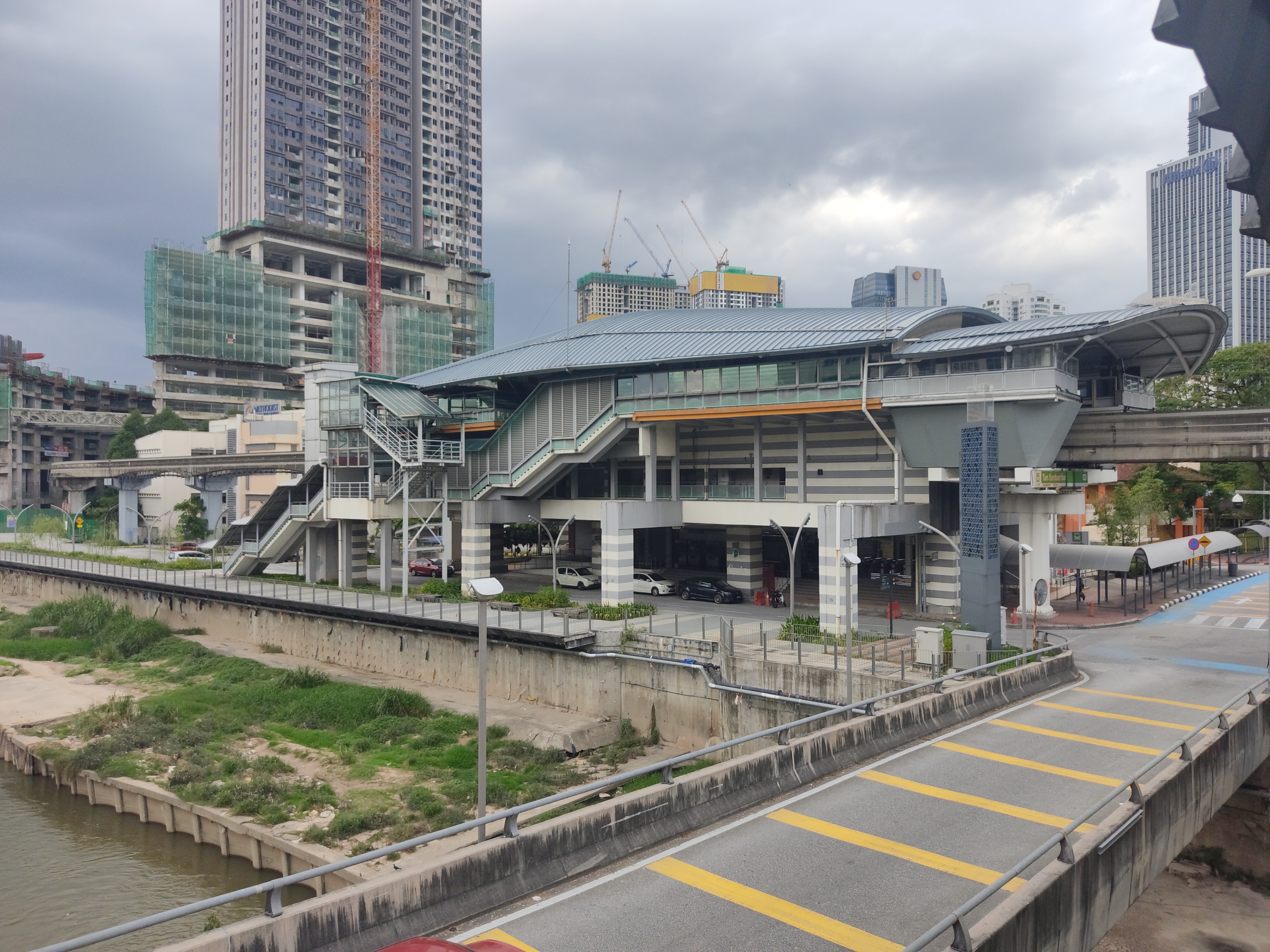
- The exterior of the Tun Sambanthan station, as seen towards the southeast.

General information
- Other names: Malay: تون سمبنثان (Jawi); Chinese: 敦善班丹; Tamil: துன் சம்பந்தன்
- Location: South side of the Jalan Tun Sambanthan 4-Jalan Tebing, Brickfields; 50470 Kuala Lumpur; Malaysia
- Coordinates: 3°7′53″N 101°41′26″E
- System: Rapid KL
- Owner: Prasarana Malaysia
- Operator: Rapid Rail
- Line: 8 KL Monorail
- Platforms: 2 side platforms
- Tracks: 2

Construction
- Structure type: Elevated
- Parking: Not available
- Cycle facilities: Not available
- Accessible: Available

Other information
- Station code: MR2

History
- Opened: 31 August 2003; 22 years ago

Services
Preceding station		Following station
Kuala Lumpur Sentral Terminus	KL Monorail	Maharajalela towards Titiwangsa
Location

Tun Sambanthan station, is a Malaysian elevated monorail station that forms a part of the Kuala Lumpur Monorail (KL Monorail) located in Kuala Lumpur and opened alongside the rest of the line and other adjoining monorail stations on 31 August 2003.

Situated at the south side of the Jalan Tun Sambanthan 4-Jalan Tebing (English: Tun Sambanthan Road 4-River Bank Road) intersection in the Brickfields district of Kuala Lumpur, the station resides on the western bank of the Klang River (or the left bank of the river), just beside Methodist College Kuala Lumpur (MCKL), and the Malaysian Association of the Blind (MAB) centre opposite Jalan Tun Sambanthan 4. The station is situated close to a pedestrian bridge that crosses the Klang River, connecting the area to Jalan Syed Putra that adjoins the Federal Highway and the Kuen Cheng High School just opposite the river. The station has only one exit which connects to the west side of Jalan Tebing.

The station is named after V. T. Sambanthan, a notable figure in the Malaysian Indian Congress (MIC). Jalan Tun Sambanthan (English: Tun Sambanthan Road), a main road in Brickfields, is also named after V. T. Sambanthan and is the location of the preceding KL Sentral monorail terminus station.

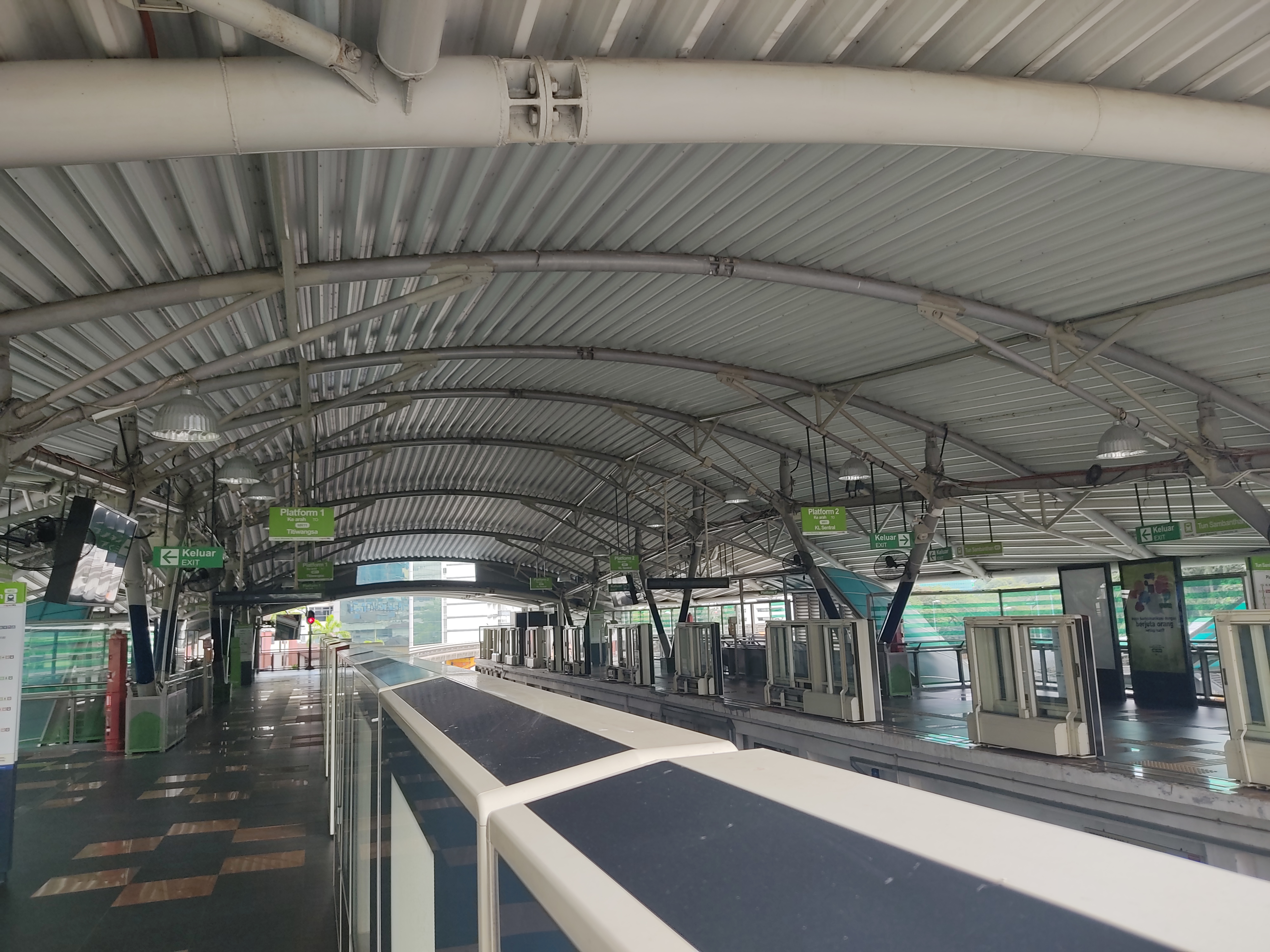
Platform of Tun Sambanthan station

== Layout ==
L2	Station Platform Level	Side platform
L2	Station Platform Level	Platform 1 8 KL Monorail towards MR11 Titiwangsa (→)
L2	Station Platform Level	Platform 2 8 KL Monorail towards MR1 KL Sentral (←)
L2	Station Platform Level	Side platform
L1	Linkway	Staircase Linkway
G	Station Concourse/Street Level	Faregates, Ticketing Machines, Monorail Station Control, Shops, Taxi Lay-by, Pedestrian Crossing. Entrance A

=== Exits and Entrances ===
The station has only one exit.

KL Monorail station
Entrance	Destination	Picture
A	Access to street level ticketing concourse. Jalan Tebing/Jalan Tun Sambanthan 4	

== See also ==
- List of rail transit stations in the Klang Valley area
