= Rapid Rail =

Metro system operator in Kuala Lumpur

Rapid Rail Sdn Bhd
- Type: Private Limited
- Industry: Public Transport Operator
- Founded: Malaysia (2002) (as Rangkaian Pengangkutan Integrasi Deras Sdn Bhd)
- Headquarters: No. 1, Jalan PJU 1A/46, Off Jalan Lapangan Terbang Subang, 47301 Petaling Jaya, Selangor.
- Area served: Klang Valley
- Key people: Amir Hamdan (Chief Executive Officer); Vacant (Chief Operating Officer, LRT & Monorail; Ramli Shafie (Chief Operating Officer, MRT
- Services: Railways
- Parent: Prasarana Malaysia
- Website: www.myrapid.com.my

Rapid Rail Sdn Bhd is the operator of the rapid transit (metro) system serving Kuala Lumpur and the Klang Valley area in Malaysia. A subsidiary of Prasarana Malaysia, it is the sole operator of six rapid transit lines which collectively form the Rapid KL rapid transit system. The system currently consists of four light rapid transit (LRT) lines, two mass rapid transit (MRT) lines and a monorail line, with another MRT currently under construction.

The LRT (narrow profile) and MRT (wide profile) lines operate on standard gauge (1,435 mm (4 ft 8 1/2 in)) rail, while the KL Monorail operates on an ALWEG straddle beam. Train services operate from 6:00 a.m. and typically end before midnight daily, with frequencies varying from approximately three minutes during peak hours to fourteen minutes during non-peak hours.

== History ==
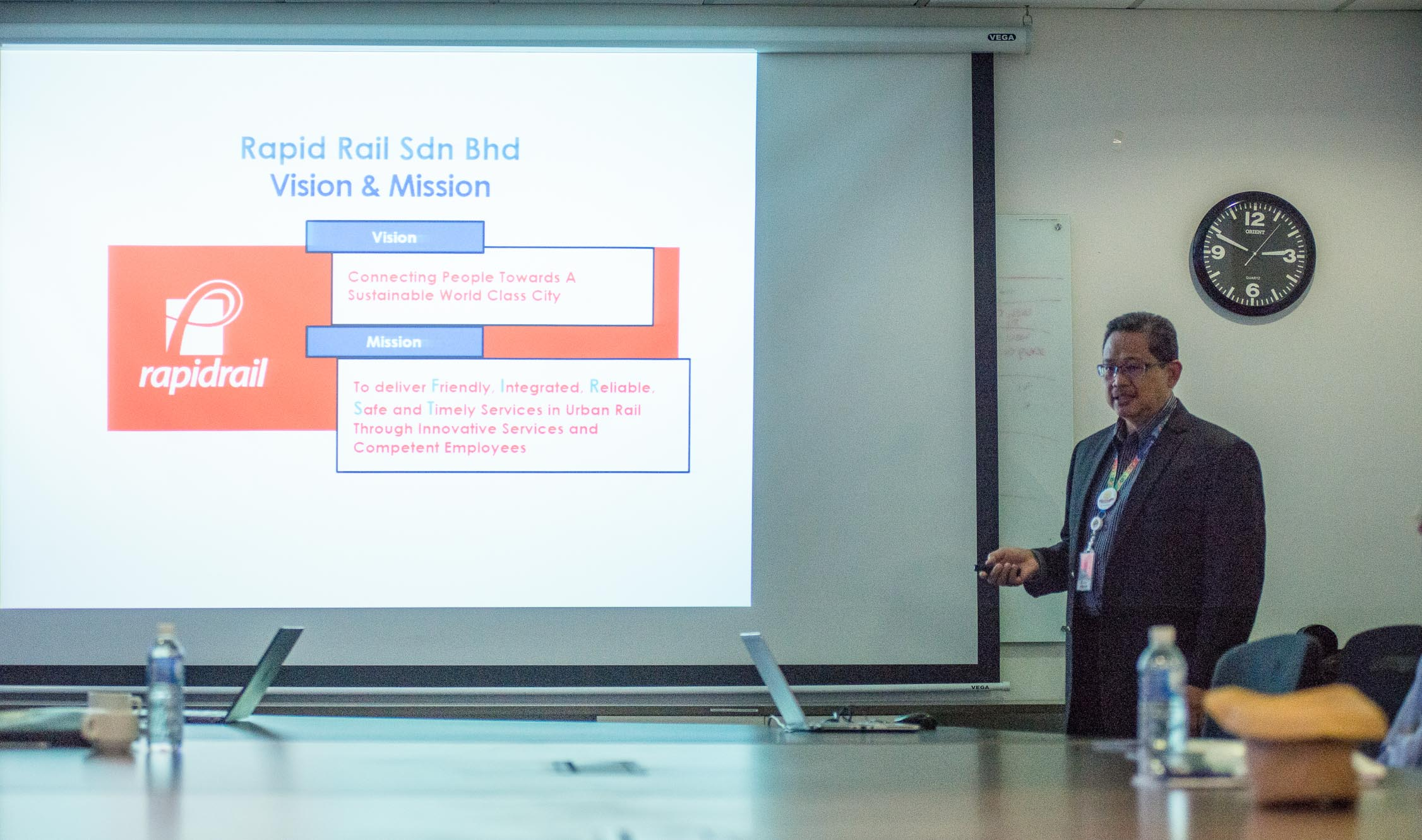

Malaysia's efforts to revolutionise commuting began in 1984 when the then Minister of Federal Territory Shahrir Abdul Samad released details of a light rapid transit (LRT) system implementation study for Kuala Lumpur. Many were skeptical over its implementation, especially when financing was a major question. The study, undertaken by a Belgian consortium in association with Spie Batignolles of France in cooperation with Master Carriage Malaysia Sdn Bhd, was for an urban or suburban LRT system - powered by overhead electric lines or catenaries. The system - covering 18 stations between Petaling Jaya and Sentul - was targeted for implementation in 1984 and completion in 1988. Unfortunately, the project did not take off until 4 years later, when the Government of Malaysia signed an agreement with Sistem Transit Aliran Ringan Sdn Bhd (STAR). The first LRT line, named STAR LRT after its owner, was constructed and opened completely in 1998. The original system consisted of 36 stations along two routes, Sentul Timur – Ampang and Sentul Timur – Sri Petaling.

Around the same time, the government signed another agreement with Projek Usahasama Transit Ringan Automatik Sdn Bhd (PUTRA) to construct the second LRT system. The line, known as PUTRA LRT, featured a single route from Gombak in the north to Kelana Jaya in the south. The section of the line was built underground and became Malaysia's first underground railway. The line was fully operational in 1999, and complemented the STAR LRT system.

However, both STAR and PUTRA ran into financial difficulties and both companies filed for bankruptcy. In 2002, both companies were bailed out by the government, and the newly formed Prasarana Malaysia took over ownership of both the lines, renaming them STAR Line and PUTRA Line respectively. In 2004, the routes were renamed and rebranded under the Rapid KL brand, with the STAR Line producing the LRT Ampang Line and LRT Sri Petaling Line, and the PUTRA Line forming the LRT Kelana Jaya Line. Operations of the three lines were assumed by Rapid Rail. In 2016, the Sri Petaling Line and Kelana Jaya Line were both extended beyond their southern termini to Subang Jaya and Puchong respectively, with both lines now sharing a common southern terminus at Putra Heights.

In the 1990s, the government of Malaysia commissioned a straddle-beam monorail to serve the city centre of Kuala Lumpur. Various delays and changes to the project occurred, however, the KL Monorail line was fully operation in 2003. The Line was owned and operated by KL Infrastructure Group. The company ran into financial difficulties, leading to a government takeover. In the end, the line was sold to Prasarana Malaysia, and was placed under the operations of Rapid Rail and was integrated into the Rapid KL system in 2007.

In 2010, then Prime Minister Najib Razak announced proposals to introduce a new mass rapid transit (MRT) system to complement the current metro system. The proposal included three new lines in a "Wheel and Spoke" formation around the city. The Mass Rapid Transit Corporation Sdn Bhd (MRT Corp) was founded in 2011 and was appointed as the owner of the project and the MRT lines, unlike the LRT and monorail lines which are owned by Prasarana Malaysia. However, Rapid Rail was awarded the concession to operate the MRT lines, thus allowing the MRT lines to be full integrated with the Rapid KL system. The first line to be constructed, the MRT Kajang Line, which runs from Sungai Buloh to Kajang, entered full revenue service in 2017.

== Fleet ==
The rolling stock of the Kelana Jaya Line, in use since the opening of the line in 1998, consists of a fleet of 35 Mark II Bombardier Advanced Rapid Transit (ART) trains with related equipment and services supplied by the Bombardier Group. The ART trains consist of two-electric multiple units, which serve as either a driving car or trailer car depending on its direction of travel. The trains use linear motors and draw power from a third rail located at the side of the steel rails. The plating in between the running rails is used for accelerating and decelerating the train. The reaction plate is semi-magnetised, which pulls the train along as well as helps it to slow down.

The ART is essentially driverless, automated to travel along lines and stop at designated stations for a limited amount of time. Nevertheless, manual override control panels are provided at each end of the trains for use in an event of an emergency.

Since October 2006, the operator has ordered 35 new 4-car trainsets to be delivered starting from 2008. Due to some delays from the manufacturer, the delivery was delayed to November 2008. After extensive series of testing, the first batch of trains began operation on 30 December 2009.

The rolling stock of the Ampang Line currently consists of a fleet of 50 new trains, better known as AMY, that are deployed to increase the capacity of the line and provide a better service. Each of the new trains is six cars long and provided by CSR Zhuzhou of China, similar to the design for İzmir Metro and Buenos Aires Underground 200 Series. These trains are disabled-friendly and include safety features like closed-circuit TVs, emergency breakable windows, emergency ventilation fans, fire and smoke detection system and supervised automatic train operation system (SATO), and other elements such as interactive destination display inside the train, non-slipping seats, LCD infotainment, walk-through gangways, and a more spacious wheelchair space for the physically challenged. The first trains were put into service on the Sri Petaling-Kinrara BK5 stretch in October 2015, and then until Putra Heights and Sentul Timur in July 2016, and finally the Ampang branch line in December 2016.

The former rolling stock of the Ampang Lines consists of a fleet of 90 standard gauge light rail vehicles manufactured in Australia by Walkers Limited. The trains consist of electric multiple units, which draw power from the underside of a third rail installed along a side of the line. All cars in each train are fitted with both current collector and motors. The trains are manned, with driver cabs occupying the tips of the trains.

The trains come in two trainset configurations. The first and most common variation is the six-car trainset, which consists of three sets of two EMUs (2+2+2) and uses the maximum platform length of the lines' stations. Each two EMU sets at the front and rear consist of one driving and one non-driving motor car, while the two EMUs between are non-driving motors. There are no gangway connections between the two-car sets. The second variation is a four-car trainset, a more obscure configuration that consists of only two EMU sets (2+2) of one driving car and one non-driving motor at each end, thus with two-thirds the capacity of the more common six-car set. The 2+2 trainsets were once used in full in the service until the massive deployment of 2+2+2 trainsets.

Each car has 3 bogies, 2 powered end bogies and one trailing bogie under the central articulation. The end cars, numbered 1101 to 1260 have driver cabs. The middle car number 2201 to 2230 have concealed driver control panels to enable the car to be moved around the depot independently.

Image	EMU/Fleet	Manufacturers	Line Code	Line(s) Served	Formation	In service On order
	Adtranz-Walkers LRV	Walkers Limited of Australia	3; 4	Ampang Line; Sri Petaling Line	4 carriage LRV; 6 carriage LRV	Operated from December 1996 until December 2016 and have been phased out
	CRRC ZELC LRV "AMY"	(China) CRRC Zhuzhou Locomotive	3; 4	Ampang Line; Sri Petaling Line	6 carriage LRV	50 trainsets (300 car)
	Bombardier Innovia Metro	(Canada) Bombardier *Consortium (Canada) Bombardier / (Malaysia) Hartasuma	5	Kelana Jaya Line	2 carriage EMU 4 carriage EMU	35 trainsets (70 car); 49 trainsets (196 car); 27 trainsets (108 car)
	MTrans Monorail	(Malaysia) Scomi Rail	8	KL Monorail	2 carriage EMU	Operated from August 2003 until December 2022 and have been phased out
	Scomi SUTRA	(Malaysia) Scomi Rail	8	KL Monorail	4 carriage EMU	6 trainsets (24 car)
	Siemens Inspiro "The Guiding Light"	*Consortium (Germany) Siemens / (China) CRRC Nanjing Puzhen / (Malaysia) SMH Rail	9	Kajang Line	4 carriage EMU	58 trainsets (232 car)
	CRRC ZELC LRV "Pingu"	*Consortium; CRRC Zhuzhou Locomotive / Siemens Ltd China / (Malaysia) Tegap Dinamik	11	Shah Alam Line	3 carriage LRV	22 trainsets (66 car)
	Hyundai Rotem "Ducky"	*Consortium (South Korea) Hyundai Rotem / (Malaysia) Apex Communications / (South Korea) POSCO Engineering	12	Putrajaya Line	4 carriage EMU	49 trainsets (196 car)

== Notable incidents ==
On 24 May 2021, at 20:33 local Malaysia time, a head-on collision occurred between a manually-driven empty train and an automated train carrying passengers, on the Kelana Jaya line between Kampung Baru and KLCC stations, in Kuala Lumpur, Malaysia. The accident caused 213 injuries, including 166 minor injuries and 47 serious injuries.
