= KL Monorail =

Monorail in Malaysia

KL Monorail Line

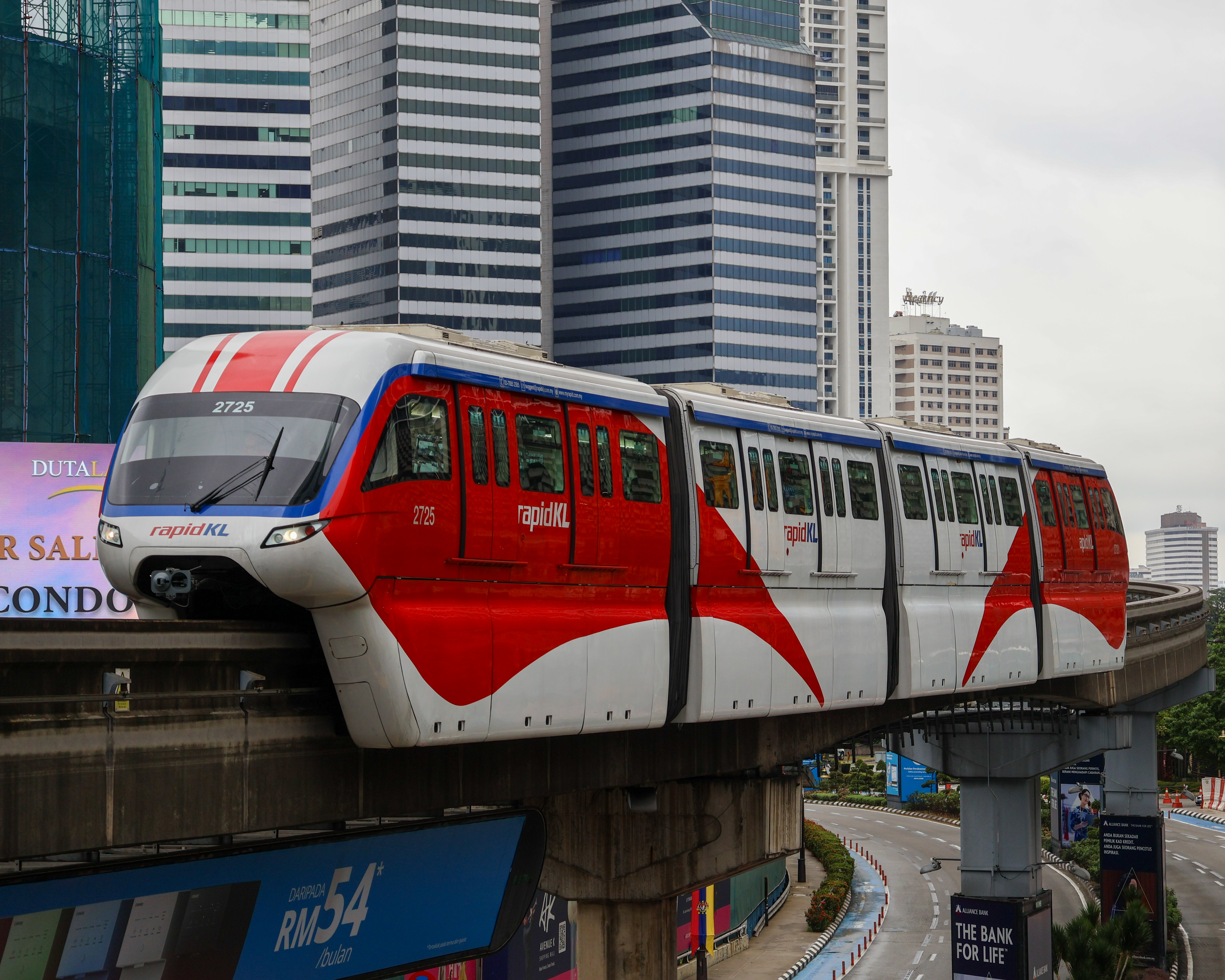
- A 4-car monorail train approaching Bukit Nanas Monorail station

Overview
- Native name: Laluan Monorel KL
- Status: Operational
- Owner: Prasarana Malaysia
- Line number: 8 (light green)
- Locale: Kuala Lumpur
- Termini: MR1 KL Sentral; MR11 Titiwangsa
- Stations: 11
- Website: myrapid.com.my

Service
- Type: Straddle-beam single-rail track monorail
- System: Rapid KL; Klang Valley Integrated Transit System
- Services: KL Sentral Monorail-Titiwangsa
- Operator: Rapid Rail
- Depot: Brickfields
- Rolling stock: Scomi SUTRA (4-car)
- Daily ridership: 58,998 (Q2 2026); 90,748 (2025; Highest)
- Ridership: 21.1 million (2025) (▲5.3%); 25.4 million (2013; Highest)

History
- Opened: 31 August 2003; 23 years ago

Technical
- Line length: 8.6 km (5.3 mi)
- Character: Elevated
- Electrification: 750 V DC third rail
- Operating speed: 60 km/h (37 mph)

The KL Monorail Line is the only operational monorail system in Malaysia. Operated as part of the Rapid KL system by Rapid Rail, a subsidiary of Prasarana Malaysia, it is one of the components of the Klang Valley Integrated Transit System. The line is numbered 8 and coloured light green on official transit maps. It is the only line in the system that is completely within the boundaries of the Federal Territory of Kuala Lumpur.

Due to improper infrastructure planning and the inadequate size of the rolling stock (to transport a large number of passengers in or out of the downtown Kuala Lumpur area during rush hour), the KL Monorail is commonly cited as the most unsatisfactory rail line of the Klang Valley Integrated Transit System.

== History ==
This urban monorail line was opened on 31 August 2003, with 11 stations running 8.6 km (5.3 mi) on two parallel elevated tracks. It connects the KL Sentral transport hub in the south and Titiwangsa in the north with the "Golden Triangle", a commercial, shopping, and entertainment area consisting of the Bukit Bintang area, and surrounded by Jalan Imbi, Jalan Bukit Bintang, Jalan Sultan Ismail, and Jalan Raja Chulan.

The monorail scheme was announced by Kuala Lumpur City Hall in January 1990 after the Malaysian Government gave the go-ahead to the scheme at a cabinet meeting in June 1989. Its cost was then estimated at RM 143 million. The 14 km (8.7 mi), 22-station system is designed to carry more than 34,000 passengers a day on a 20-minute loop through Kuala Lumpur's bustling commercial core. The plan is to build it in two phases: in the first, 16 stations will be served over 7.7 km (4.8 mi); and in the later stage, another 6.5 km (4.0 mi) loop will be added. The first phase was expected to be completed within two years.

According to plans dating back to the 1990s, the planned line was to have two branches (similar to the Ampang and Sri Petaling Lines), with one branch going via Maharajalela station and then on to the city centre, and the other branch going to Mid Valley, Abdullah Hukum, Jalan Klang Lama and ending at Kampung Pasir, which will probably include integration with KTM Komuter's Tanjung Malim–Port Klang Line at Petaling or Pantai Dalam stations. KL Sentral and Tun Sambanthan were planned to be the common stations. Ultimately only the downtown branch was built, due to the 1997 Asian financial crisis.

While another plan from Kuala Lumpur People-Mover Rapid Transit (PRT), under the "Kuala Lumpur Linear City" development plan, depicts that the project will include building 16 kilometres (9.9 mi) of twin track monorail guideway beams, 20 elevated stations, two depots and 14 monorail trains. There will be two phases to the project's construction. Between Jalan Tun Razak and Brickfields, Section 1 will span approximately 8 kilometres, while Section 2 would connect Tun Sambanthan and KL Sentral Station via a 12-stop shuttle service. Section 2, which is unfinished and spans 8 km (5.0 mi), begins in Brickfields and travels via Kampung Abdullah Hukum, Lembah Pantai, Pantai Dalam, Taman Desa, OUG, and finally ends at Kampung Pasir. KL PRT Sdn Bhd would oversee the project management while carrying out the PRT transport system's construction, upkeep, and operation during the course of a 30-year concession. The PRT system planned to accommodate up to 18,000 passengers per hour per direction (pphpd) with 168 seats in each train and 630 passengers per train at a headway of up to two minutes between trains. The first section of the project, which runs between P. Ramlee Station and Hang Tuah Station, was supposed to be finished in time for trial runs during the Commonwealth Games in September 1998. Construction on the project started in December 1996 and Sections 1 and 2 were scheduled to be finished in early 1999 and 2000 respectively.

Work was scheduled to begin in June 1990, but was postponed to May 1991 after the city's mayor complained that tenders submitted for preparatory work were too high. There has been no activity on the project since and few details are available on how the project is expected to proceed. The main contractor is a local company, BNK, which had little success in its search for backers to finance its share of the venture. Part of its problem in securing money stems from the project's escalating cost estimates, and part from its lack of a track record in handling such huge projects.

Construction was re-initiated by Hitachi, but the 1997 Asian financial crisis led to cessation of work in December 1997. When work was resumed in July 1998, MTrans took over, locally manufacturing its own rolling stock and completing the project to save cost; the line was completed at a cost of MYR 1.18 billion.

As the line was opened in 2003, it was agreed that the parent company and owner of the KL Monorail Line, KL Monorail System Sdn Bhd (KLMS) under its parent company KL Infrastructure Group (KL Infra), would hold a 40-year concession to operate the monorail. The line and number of stations remains unchanged since 2003. Based on the 1999 transit map, the KL Monorail line originally had 19 stations, starting from Titiwangsa, Chow Kit, Wawasan, P. Ramlee, Raja Chulan, Bukit Bintang, Imbi, Hang Tuah, Merdeka, Sultan Sulaiman (cancelled), Tun Sambanthan, and a subsequently unbuilt extension which consisted of stations in Syed Putra, Taman Seputeh, Abdullah Hukum, Lembah Pantai, Pantai Dalam, Taman Desa, OUG and Kampung Pasir.

Since the start of operations, the KL Infrastructure Group suffered losses, largely due to depreciation and interest repayment costs. On 30 April 2004, KL Infra posted a net loss of MYR 46.24 million on a MYR 15.08 million revenue. KL Infra had also taken up a MYR 300 million Malaysian government loan and a MYR 260 million infrastructure loan from the Bank Pembangunan Malaysia Berhad (BPMB) (The development bank of Malaysia) (Malay: Bank Pembangunan Malaysia, BPM). In addition, KL Infra had proposed to buy MTrans' three subsidiary companies to improve its business, but failed after Scomi bought up some of the targeted companies.

=== Government takeover ===
In April 2007, talks were under way between KL Infra and the government and the Bank Pembangunan Malaysia Berhad to sell the KL Monorail Line to the Prasarana Malaysia, which then had already owned both the Kelana Jaya Line and the Ampang Line, as well as 10% of KL Infra shares. KL Infra was cited as intending to exit Malaysia's monorail business. The takeover is part of the government's master plan to improve the urban public transport sector.

SPN gave its agreement in principle to the takeover on 22 December 2006 and a follow-up meeting was held on 6 February 2007 with the government on the takeover of its operational assets and assumption of loan liabilities. A due diligence audit was conducted from 5 March 2007 to 27 April 2007 by consultants appointed by the government. Following agreement to the takeover, BPM granted KL Monorail an extension until 29 April 2007 for an interest repayment amounting to MYR 4,244,801.91, which was originally due on 29 December 2006.

However, the takeover seemed to have suffered a setback at least from the perspective of KL Infra when on 26 March 2007, it was notified by BPM that it was not going to entertain any further extensions for interest repayment. Subsequently on 27 April 2007, the bank notified that it would not be granting any moratorium on interest repayments. On 29 April 2007, KL Monorail was not able to make the repayment of the interest instalment which had become due.

On 3 May 2007, KL Monorail was issued a default notice by BPM which sought repayment of the entire principal sum of MYR 609,616,423.73 and capitalised interest of MYR 296,428,910.88 totalling MYR 906,045,334.61. The company was granted seven days from that day to repay the entire sum, which it failed to do. On 14 May 2007, Mohd Anwar Bin Yahya and Cho Choo Meng were appointed receivers and managers by Amanah Raya, the Security Trustee for BPM. Nevertheless, the takeover process is still deemed ongoing, KL Infra stating that it will continue to engage the government and BPM to address the proposed takeover of KL Monorail by Prasarana based on earlier discussions and an approval in principle.

One of the effects of the appointment of receivers and managers is the possibility that KL Infra would not be receiving any compensation for KL Monorail should the takeover by SPN have gone through.

The trading of KL Infra was suspended from 15 May 2007. On the same day, KL Infra's board announced to Bursa Malaysia that it had formed the opinion that it was not solvent and would not be able to pay all its debts in full within a period not exceeding twelve months. On 28 November 2007, Prasarana Malaysia signed a sale-and-purchase agreement with KL Monorail Systems, effectively making Prasarana the operator of KL Monorail, and resulting in Prasarana taking over the MYR 882 million BPM loan.

== List of stations ==
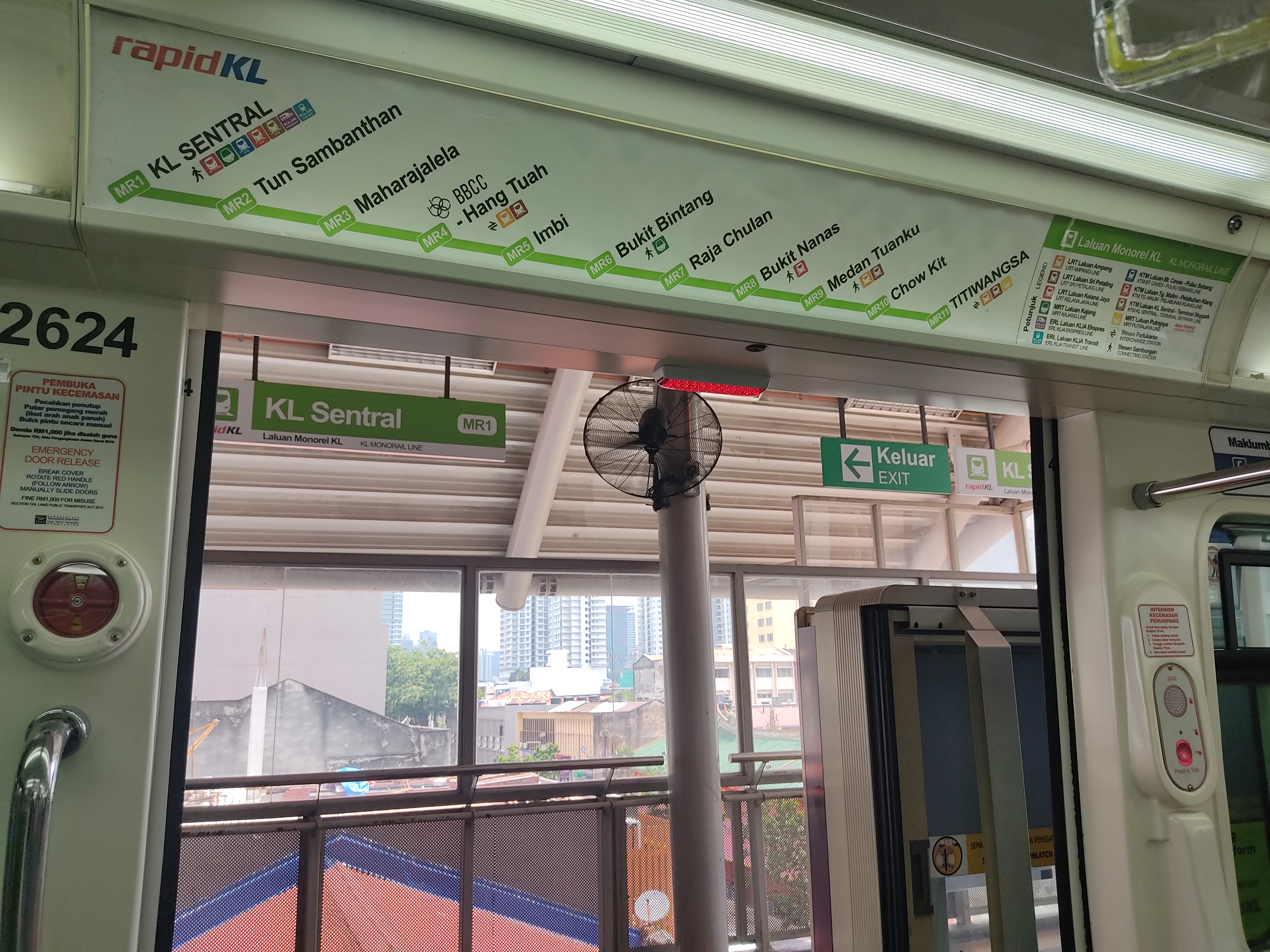
KL Monorail route map display

The line consists of a single dual-way line that links areas of inner Kuala Lumpur not served by rail transport, namely Brickfields, Bukit Bintang, and Chow Kit, with existing LRT, MRT, ERL and KTM Komuter stations at KL Sentral, Muzium Negara, Hang Tuah, Bukit Bintang, Dang Wangi, Sultan Ismail, and Titiwangsa. The two termini are on a single track with a Spanish solution layout.

The stations are designed as elevated structures with ticketing facilities on either the ground level (as seen in the KL Sentral station) or the first-floor level. The platforms are on the top floor, separated from the monorail lines by fencing. They were originally covered by large canvas roofs, which were replaced in 2014 by aluminium zinc roofs. Certain stations are situated above roadways, or are slightly longer than others. Each station used to be designated with a sponsor, with route maps associating each station with a particular product brand.

The depot is between KL Sentral and Tun Sambanthan.

Station code	Station name	Images	Platform type	Interchange station	Notes
MR1	KL Sentral		Terminus (Spanish solution)	Southern terminus. Connecting station to the KL Sentral main terminal building via NU Sentral shopping mall for: KA01 KS01 KTM Batu Caves-Pulau Sebang Line, KTM Tanjung Malim-Port Klang Line, KTM KL Sentral-Terminal Skypark Line and KTM ETS; KJ15 Kelana Jaya Line; KE1 ERL KLIA Ekspres; KT1 ERL KLIA Transit; Connecting station to KG15 Muzium Negara on the Kajang Line via a 850-meter linkbridge from main terminal building.	Exit to NU Sentral Mall
MR2	Tun Sambanthan		Side		Exit to Methodist College Kuala Lumpur (MCKL).
MR3	Maharajalela		Side		Exit to Merdeka 118.
MR4	BBCC–Hang Tuah		Side	Interchange station with AG9 SP9 Ampang and Sri Petaling lines.	Exit to LaLaport and Bukit Bintang City Centre (BBCC) via a transit hub.
MR5	Imbi		Side		Exit to Berjaya Times Square via an elevated walkway.
MR6	Bukit Bintang		Side	Connecting station with KG18A Kajang Line.	Pedestrian access to KJ10 KLCC on the Kelana Jaya Line via an elevated walkway from Pavilion Kuala Lumpur. Exit to Lot 10 and Sungei Wang Plaza via elevated walkways.
MR7	Raja Chulan		Side		Pedestrian access to KJ10 KLCC on the Kelana Jaya Line via an elevated walkway from Pavilion Kuala Lumpur.
MR8	Bukit Nanas		Side	Connecting station with KJ12 Dang Wangi on the Kelana Jaya Line via a covered pedestrian walkway.	Exit to Kuala Lumpur Tower
MR9	Medan Tuanku		Side	Connecting station with AG5 SP5 Sultan Ismail on the Ampang and Sri Petaling lines via 580 meter elevated walkway.	Exit to Quill City Mall via an elevated walkway.
MR10	Chow Kit		Side		Exit to Chow Kit district and Hospital Kuala Lumpur.
MR11	Titiwangsa		Terminus (Spanish solution)	Northern terminus. Interchange station with AG3 SP3 PY17 Ampang and Sri Petaling lines and Putrajaya Line. Proposed interchange with CC09 MRT Circle Line.	Bus terminal to Genting Highlands

Route of KL Monorail

=== Expansion ===
To some extent, the line has been designed to accommodate future expansion. While some stations are significantly longer than the former 2-car trainsets, providing room for longer trainsets, extension works for other stations have been necessary. An expansion project known as the KL Monorail Fleet Expansion project is being carried out by Prasarana to ensure a more efficient and user-friendly monorail services in the future. The installation of the Platform Automatic Gate System (PAGS) is one such work under the project. This gate system is necessary to improve passenger safety as before this, there are no barriers between the passenger platforms and the tracks and this may pose dangers to the users. The project also includes the installation of a new signalling system, construction of a new depot to accommodate larger train sets, and other station upgrades and universal access facilities.

An example of station upgrades is at Bukit Bintang station. Touted as one of the busiest stations of the line due to its proximity to Bukit Bintang, the hub of shopping and entertainment in Kuala Lumpur, it used to have only one exit, but the upgrading project now provided the station with added an alternative entrance and exit walkway and a direct entry to the Lot 10 and Sungei Wang Plaza shopping complexes. The monorail station is also equipped with new ticket vending machines and ticketing gates. Other than that, escalators and lifts as well as a new Customer Service Office are also provided. Another example is at the second busiest monorail station, Kuala Lumpur Sentral station, where the Nu Sentral Mall overhead bridge becomes the new entrance to the station. Previously, monorail users needed to exit KL Sentral and cross the busy main thoroughfare in Brickfields to reach the station. The completion of the overhead bridge now enables customers to travel between KL Sentral and the monorail station safely and conveniently.

The main goal of the fleet expansion project is, however, the introduction of new, state-of-the-art 4-car trains. Two 4-car trains were introduced to the public while the rest were delivered in stages until the fourth quarter of 2015. The new 4-car trains can accommodate up to 430 passengers per trip and could significantly reduce the waiting time for passengers. They are also more comfortable and spacious than the previous 2-car trains. After all sets of 4-car trains were delivered and commissioned, the 2-car trains, which had been in operation since 2003, were retired. Besides having a larger capacity, the new trains are also fitted with better safety features including open-door windows, on-board closed-circuit television cameras and "run-flat" features, which allow the trains to continue moving in the event of a puncture.

== Rolling stock ==
=== 2-car ALWEG rolling stock ===
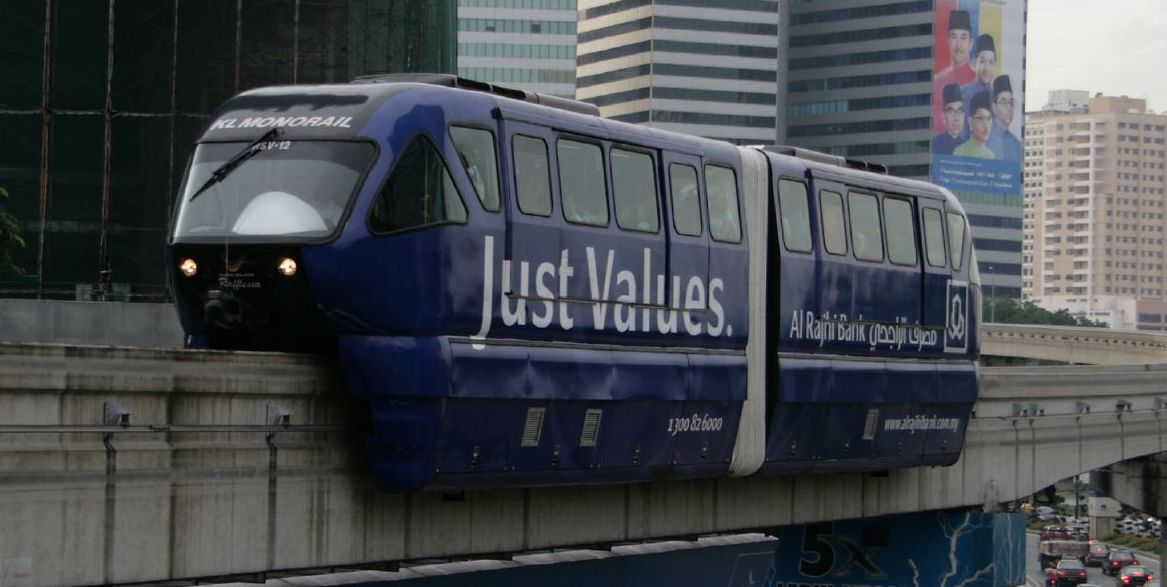
Former 2-car ALWEG rolling stock (2003-2022)

The first trains used on the KL Monorail line were 10 sets of permanently coupled 2-car trains of a similar design to the Seattle Center Monorail's ALWEG trains. Each monorail train could accommodate 158 passengers during regular operations. The monorail carriages themselves were constructed by Scomi Rail, a Malaysian monorail manufacturer, at the Scomi Rail plant in Rawang, which also featured its own tracks for monorail train tests. In June 2017, the monorail was operated solely using 6 sets of 2-car trains. As of December 2022, all 2-car trains had been fully withdrawn from service.

=== 4-car Scomi SUTRA rolling stock ===
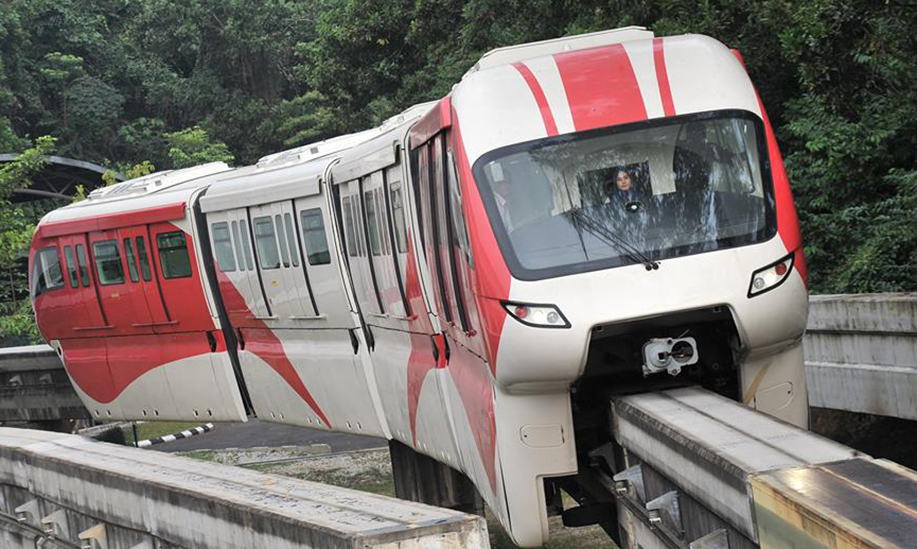
4-car Scomi SUTRA rolling stock

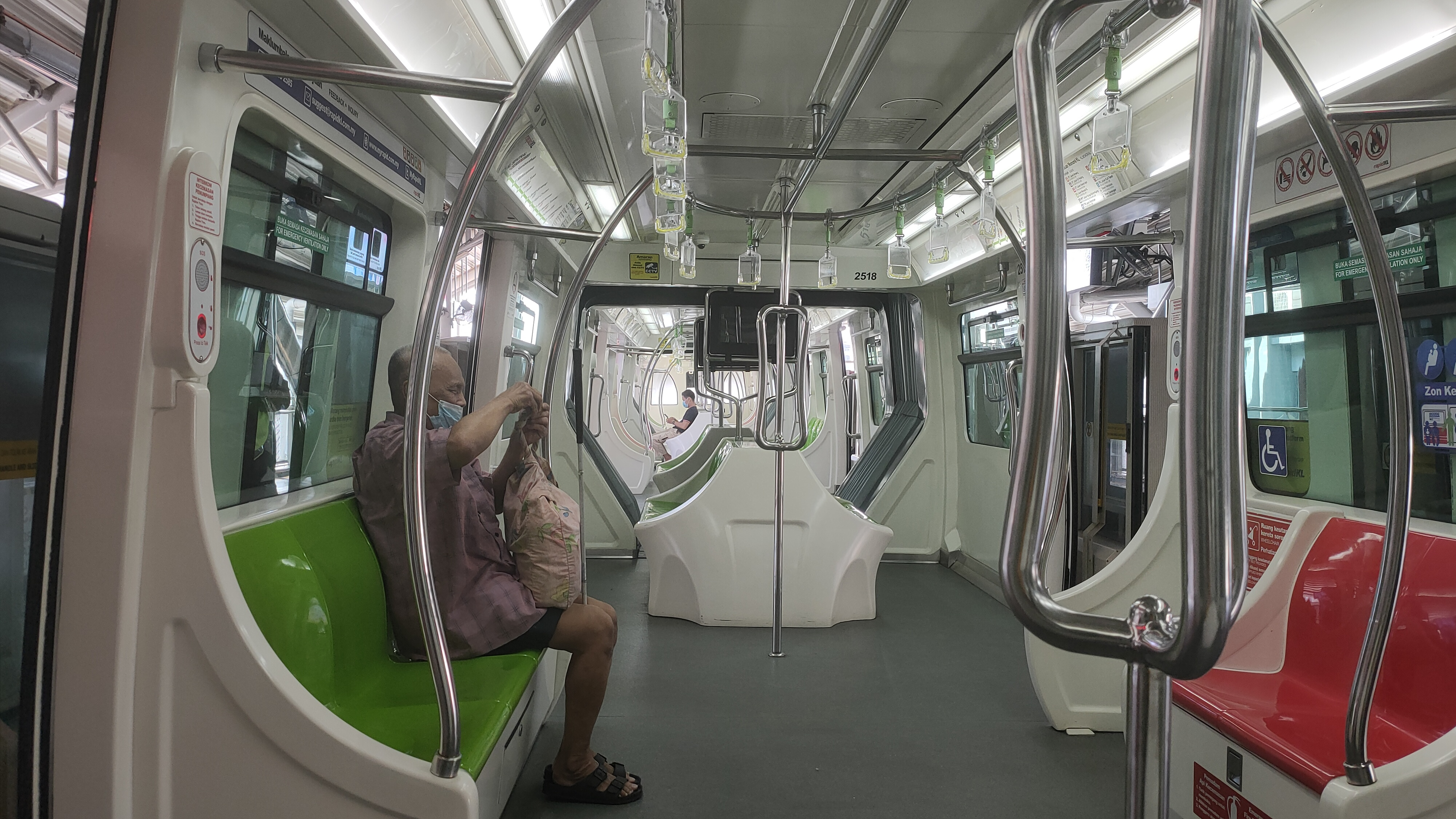
The interior of KL Monorail Scomi SUTRA car

The KL Monorail subsequently began upgrading its rolling stock to brand-new, 4-car trains. These were also manufactured by Scomi, this time to the company's in-house-developed SUTRA design, which was also ordered by the Mumbai Monorail line in India. Each of these trains can accommodate 430 passengers per trip, compared with 213 passengers for the 2-car trains. The new trains are equipped with four closed-circuit television cameras and space for wheelchairs and strollers.

The first two sets of 4-car trains entered service in December 2014, with the remaining units scheduled to be arriving in stages. While they were initially all scheduled to be in operation by the end of 2015, only five had been delivered so far. They were taken out of service in May 2017 due to safety reasons. Three of the 4-car trains were reinstated in August 2019, with two more expected to re-enter service in November of the same year. In 2019, the KL Monorail service was operated using five sets of 4-car trains and four sets of 2-car trains. Once the delivery of the remaining 7 sets of 4-car trains were completed, the original ALWEG 2-car trains were decommissioned.

=== Upcoming fleet refreshment ===
In 2024, it was announced that three train sets will be added to the current fleet in line with plans to improve frequency, with reports indicating waiting times could be reduced from every seven minutes to either five or three minutes. The new train sets are expected to be delivered in 2026.

== Ridership ==
The monthly ridership increased from 341,850 passengers in September 2003 to 1.18 million passengers in August 2004. In January 2007, the monorail attained its 50 millionth passenger since its opening. On 29 July 2009, the monorail reportedly reached the 100 million passenger mark.

KL Monorail Ridership
Year	Month/Quarter	Ridership	Annual Ridership	Change (%)	Note
2026	Q4	1,786,983	17,299,728		As of October 2026
2026	Q3	5,329,442	17,299,728		
2026	Q2	5,076,075	17,299,728		
2026	Q1	5,107,228	17,299,728		
2025	Q4	5,494,778	21,101,210	▲5.3	
2025	Q3	5,408,317	21,101,210	▲5.3	
2025	Q2	5,122,597	21,101,210	▲5.3	
2025	Q1	5,075,518	21,101,210	▲5.3	
2024	Q4	5,356,630	20,032,392	▲10.6	
2024	Q3	5,012,723	20,032,392	▲10.6	
2024	Q2	4,772,775	20,032,392	▲10.6	
2024	Q1	4,890,264	20,032,392	▲10.6	
2023	Q4	5,108,521	18,107,573	▲69.7	
2023	Q3	4,628,078	18,107,573	▲69.7	
2023	Q2	4,271,287	18,107,573	▲69.7	
2023	Q1	4,099,687	18,107,573	▲69.7	
2022	Q4	3,505,358	10,668,069	▲152.4	
2022	Q3	3,125,274	10,668,069	▲152.4	
2022	Q2	2,434,132	10,668,069	▲152.4	
2022	Q1	1,603,305	10,668,069	▲152.4	
2021	Q4	1,498,400	4,226,329	▼40.8	Total lockdown
2021	Q3	591,448	4,226,329	▼40.8	Total lockdown
2021	Q2	968,990	4,226,329	▼40.8	Total lockdown
2021	Q1	1,167,491	4,226,329	▼40.8	Total lockdown
2020	Q4	1,418,564	7,143,534	▼ -43.0	COVID-19 pandemic
2020	Q3	2,021,544	7,143,534	▼ -43.0	COVID-19 pandemic
2020	Q2	774,603	7,143,534	▼ -43.0	COVID-19 pandemic
2020	Q1	2,928,823	7,143,534	▼ -43.0	COVID-19 pandemic
2019	Q4	3,749,951	12,535,738	▼ -0.5	
2019	Q3	3,077,452	12,535,738	▼ -0.5	
2019	Q2	2,853,647	12,535,738	▼ -0.5	
2019	Q1	2,854,688	12,535,738	▼ -0.5	
2018	Q4	2,979,758	12,594,377	▼ -25.2	
2018	Q3	3,047,678	12,594,377	▼ -25.2	
2018	Q2	3,110,144	12,594,377	▼ -25.2	
2018	Q1	3,456,797	12,594,377	▼ -25.2	
2017	Q4	3,676,155	16,841,630	▼ -23.4	
2017	Q3	3,696,196	16,841,630	▼ -23.4	
2017	Q2	4,434,559	16,841,630	▼ -23.4	
2017	Q1	5,034,720	16,841,630	▼ -23.4	
2016	Q4	5,560,782	21,990,242	▼ -12.3	
2016	Q3	5,538,256	21,990,242	▼ -12.3	
2016	Q2	5,426,504	21,990,242	▼ -12.3	
2016	Q1	5,464,700	21,990,242	▼ -12.3	
2015	Q4	6,330,893	25,067,867	▲3.1	
2015	Q3	6,309,110	25,067,867	▲3.1	
2015	Q2	6,140,591	25,067,867	▲3.1	
2015	Q1	6,287,273	25,067,867	▲3.1	
2014	Q4	6,589,282	24,303,465	▼ -4.5	
2014	Q3	5,486,658	24,303,465	▼ -4.5	
2014	Q2	6,041,153	24,303,465	▼ -4.5	
2014	Q1	6,186,372	24,303,465	▼ -4.5	
2013	Q4	6,662,241	25,437,621	▲4.1	Highest on record
2013	Q3	6,448,064	25,437,621	▲4.1	Highest on record
2013	Q2	6,186,463	25,437,621	▲4.1	Highest on record
2013	Q1	6,140,853	25,437,621	▲4.1	Highest on record
2012	Q4	6,600,809	24,435,931	▲1.0	
2012	Q3	6,060,869	24,435,931	▲1.0	
2012	Q2	5,918,621	24,435,931	▲1.0	
2012	Q1	5,855,632	24,435,931	▲1.0	
2011	Q4	6,487,498	24,200,299	▲9.5	
2011	Q3	6,233,496	24,200,299	▲9.5	
2011	Q2	5,788,893	24,200,299	▲9.5	
2011	Q1	5,690,412	24,200,299	▲9.5	
2010	Q4	6,005,553	22,108,308	▲5.2	
2010	Q3	5,630,880	22,108,308	▲5.2	
2010	Q2	5,185,841	22,108,308	▲5.2	
2010	Q1	5,286,034	22,108,308	▲5.2	
2009	Q4	5,552,400	21,021,390	▼ -3.4	
2009	Q3	5,203,323	21,021,390	▼ -3.4	
2009	Q2	5,041,678	21,021,390	▼ -3.4	
2009	Q1	5,223,989	21,021,390	▼ -3.4	
2008	Q4	5,650,778	21,765,233	▼ -1.9	
2008	Q3	5,710,316	21,765,233	▼ -1.9	
2008	Q2	5,241,529	21,765,233	▼ -1.9	
2008	Q1	5,162,610	21,765,233	▼ -1.9	
2007			22,197,169	▲14.9	
2006			19,322,170	▲19.2	
2005			16,206,441	▲32.8	
2004			12,201,518	▲278.9	
2003			3,220,297	-	September—December 2003

== Accident and incidents ==
=== David Chelliah accident ===
Prior to the opening, on 16 August 2002 an accident occurred during a test run involving a 13.4 kg (30 lb) safety wheel falling off a train and hitting the head of a pedestrian walking under the monorail viaduct at Jalan Sultan Ismail. The victim, David Chelliah, a journalist, suffered injuries that required hospitalisation.

On 7 March 2003, Chelliah filed a MYR 5 million negligence suit against the companies involved in the design, installation and operation of the trains, as well as the Director-General of Railways. On 8 April 2003, the High Court ruled that the monorail company was liable for the incident, but not the Director-General of Railways. Although the monorail company reported that any such accident was "unlikely" as six bolts would have to be removed for it to occur and furthermore, a check of all 23 other safety wheels on the train involved did not turn up any other issues, the high court judgement ruled that the monorail company "failed to provide a reasonable explanation as to how the safety wheel had come off the train and instead relied on the possibility that there had been tampering by unknown persons".

As a result of this accident, the launch of the monorail was postponed.

=== Burst tyre incident ===
On 22 January 2005, a pneumatic load tyre suddenly burst and injured two female passengers. The train, carrying about 30 passengers, was about to depart from Chow Kit station to Titiwangsa station when the incident occurred at about 8.50pm. The burst tyre caused a rubber sidewall panel to flip open and hit the side of a passenger seat, injuring one woman in the legs and another woman in the hands. Train services were suspended for about 30 minutes following the incident.

=== Breakdown ===
On 11 August 2012, a train stalled near Tun Sambanthan in Brickfields. The breakdown caused 183 passengers to be trapped for about two hours. The air conditioning system in the carriage stopped functioning when the power supply was cut. As a result, some passengers had to break the windows to allow air in while awaiting rescue. Fire and Rescue Department personnel later used a skylift to rescue passengers trapped in the carriage. Investigation revealed that the issue was due to a power supply disruption at the circuit breaker, causing the auxiliary power system to fail.

Six days later, another breakdown occurred. A train stalled between Imbi and Bukit Bintang for about 30 minutes, trapping around 200 passengers. This time however, there was power in the train and the air-conditioning system was functional. Train services resumed after half an hour.

=== Titiwangsa station fire ===
On 30 March 2015, the line was temporarily suspended after a rubber tyre of a four-car train caught fire at Titiwangsa Station. Passengers were safely evacuated with no injuries reported. The Fire and Rescue department extinguished the fire after 30 minutes.

=== Maharajalela station fire ===
On 24 December 2020, at around 7:15am a KL Monorail train bound for KL Sentral was approaching the Maharajalela station when one of its tires burst, catching fire. While the Scomi's 4-car train set 24 sustained significant damage, there are no injuries/casualties reported in the incident.

=== Tyre fire ===
On 19 December 2023, a coach guide tyre caught fire and fell from the coach onto the road underneath. The incident happened near Titiwangsa Station. The train was halted and passengers evacuated while the fire brigade dealt with the fire. There were no casualties.

=== Tree collapsed nearby monorail tracks ===
On 7 May 2024, a 50-year old tree near Concorde Hotel Kuala Lumpur collapsed on Jalan Sultan Ismail, hitting 17 vehicles and the nearby monorail tracks, leaving one dead and one injured. The monorail service was disrupted, with temporary suspension of stations between KL Sentral and Medan Tuanku stations for cleaning and repair of the tracks. Normal services resumed at 5.00 pm the next day.

== Proposed extension ==
- Phase 1: from KL Sentral to Happy Garden/Jalan Klang Lama (part of the original 1990s proposal)
- Phase 2: from Happy Garden to Sunway (replaced by LRT Kelana Jaya Line extension and BRT Sunway Line)
- Phase 3: from Titiwangsa to Matrade
