= São Mateus–Jabaquara Metropolitan Corridor =

Bus rapid-transit line in São Paulo, Brazil

São Mateus - Jabaquara Metropolitan Corridor
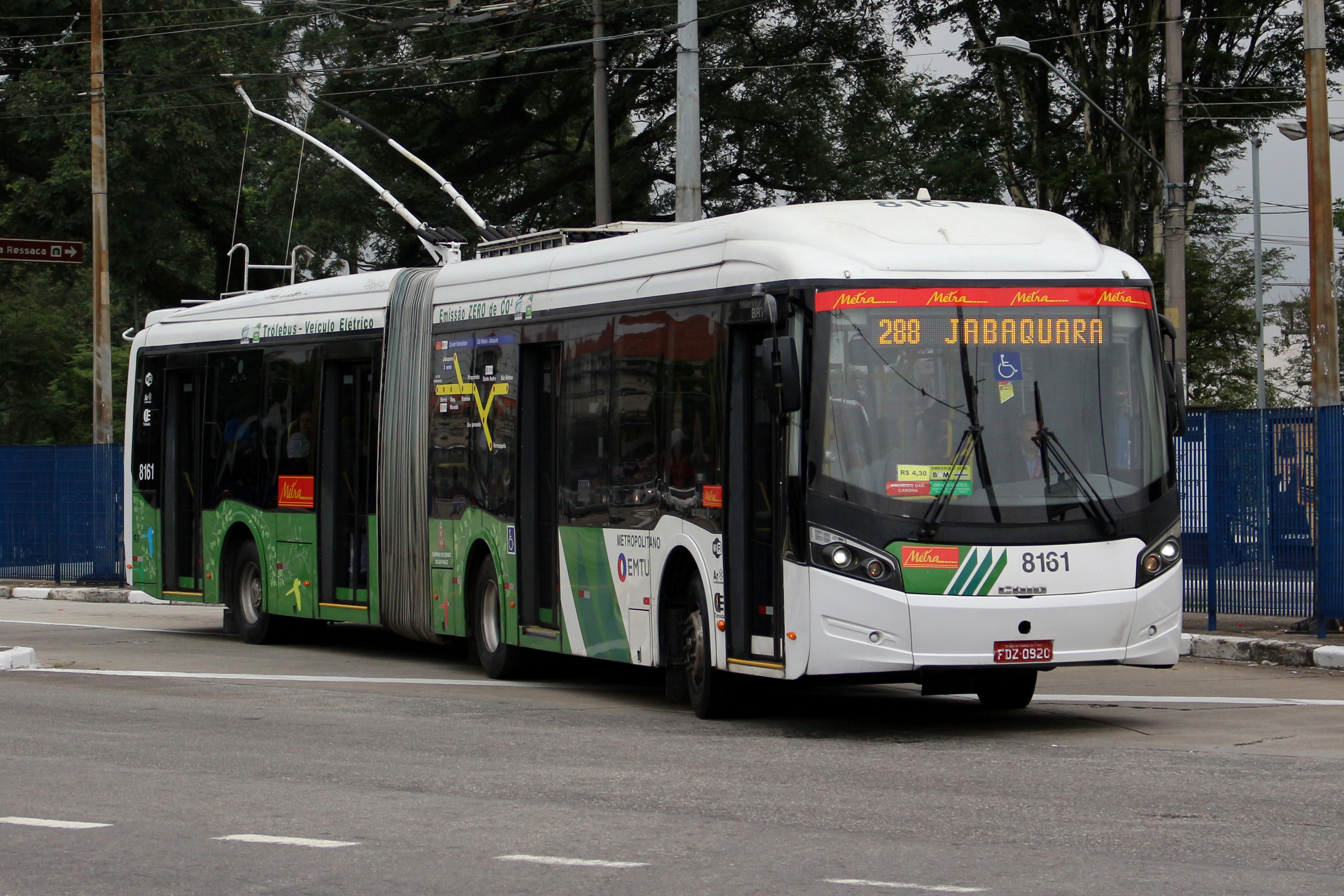

Overview
- Owner: ARTESP
- Locale: São Paulo; Diadema; São Bernardo do Campo; Santo André
- Transit type: Trolleybus; Bus rapid transit
- Number of lines: 13 (8 Trolleybus lines)
- Number of stations: 111 (8 Trolleybus stations)
- Daily ridership: 250,000
- Website: www.nextmobilidade.com.br

Operation
- Began operation: 3 December 1988
- Operators: EMTU (1988-1996); METRA (1997-2022); Next Mobilidade (2022–present)
- Number of vehicles: 260
- Headway: 3 minutes

Technical
- System length: 33 km (21 mi)
- Electrification: Overhead line, 650 V DC

The São Mateus–Jabaquara metropolitan corridor (Portuguese: Corredor Metropolitano São Mateus-Jabaquara), also called ABD Corridor (Corredor ABD) is a bus rapid transit line in Brazil, linking the city of São Paulo to three neighboring cities, Diadema, São Bernardo do Campo and Santo André, as well as (indirectly) Mauá. Operations started in 1988. Its other name references one letter per city (A for Santo André, B for São Bernardo do Campo, and D for Diadema), the same way the ABC region in Greater São Paulo is named.

Sâo Mateus and Jabaquara are city districts within São Paulo's jurisdiction, borrowing their names for the bus lane as they were its original termini. Despite its name, no bus lines connect both sites directly; passengers interchange buses at a linking station. The system was rated the most satisfying transportation mode in the Metropolitan Region of São Paulo, with a 79% approval rate, surpassing the long-lasting winning streak of São Paulo Metro (74% approval rate), according to the National Association for Public Transport's (Associação Nacional de Transportes Públicos) 2011 survey.

== History ==
In 1975, the São Paulo state government established a council to coordinate actions to improve the Greater São Paulo region, including transportation policies. The council, Codegran - Conselho Deliberativo da Grande São Paulo (Deliberative Council for Greater São Paulo), envisioned a comprehensive trolleybus network to assist the public transportation system in the region bonded to São Paulo Metro and the existing commuter rail systems at that time (the federal government-owned RFFSA and the state-owned FEPASA, later merged into CPTM network). The project started in 1984, as the National Bank for Economic and Social Development (BNDES) granted a loan for the works, although its conclusion was uncertain. Resumptions, loss of median strips in local avenues, and the path itself were all difficulties stated at that time.

Construction was announced to start in 1985, aiming to carry 150,000 passengers a day and to replace a costlier, nonviable metro line for that region, though it was superseded with the announcement of line 18 of São Paulo Metro. Effective work started in 1985 when its future operations control center was erected after a ceremony hosted by the Governor of São Paulo, André Franco Montoro. In 1987, Montoro inaugurated the Piraporinha terminal. Only 3 kilometres (1.9 mi) of lane had been completed - compared to 33 kilometres (21 mi) of the complete project - and employing diesel-fueled buses rather than trolleybuses. Service was expanded in 1988, as the branch from São Mateus to Ferrazópolis was inaugurated. The full extension of the corridor was accomplished only in 1990, with the Jabaquara terminal inauguration, hosted by Governor Orestes Quércia. This last branch was not electrified, thus demanding the use of diesel-fueled buses for all bus routes linking Jabaquara and Diadema termini to the other destinations in the system. Such electrification would only be completed in 2011.

== Operation ==
At first, construction and operation was assigned to São Paulo Metro Operator (Companhia do Metropolitano de S. Paulo, a state-owned enterprise committed to build and manage the rapid transit system within São Paulo). Later, operational responsibility was transferred to EMTU, while Metro retained the responsibility for construction. However, in 1996 the government transferred operations to private ownership, to include the substitution of diesel buses by electrical-powered cars. Operation and maintenance tasks were transferred to Metra Concessionaire (Concessionária Metra) in 1997 for the next 20 years.

=== Lines ===
São Mateus - Jabaquara Lines
#	Departure	Arrival	Weekdays headway	Saturday headway	Sunday headway	Travel time
284	São Mateus	Santo André Oeste	8-10 minutes off-peak; 3 minutes peak hours	12-15 minutes off-peak; 5-7 minutes peak hours	15-22 minutes off-peak; 9-10 minutes peak hours	25 minutes
284M	São Mateus	São Bernardo	8-17 minutes off-peak; 7-10 minutes peak hours	No service	No service	45 minutes
285	São Mateus	Ferrazópolis	10-16 minutes off-peak; 5-8 minutes peak hours	15-50 minutes off-peak; 7-12 minutes peak hours	12-20 minutes off-peak; 8-10 minutes peak hours	60 minutes
286	Santo André Oeste	Ferrazópolis	8-10 minutes off-peak; 6-8 minutes peak hours	9-15 minutes off-peak; 9 minutes peak hours	15-19 minutes off-peak; 13 minutes peak hours	30 minutes
287	Santo André Oeste	Diadema	7-8 minutes off-peak; 4-7 minutes peak hours	10-15 minutes off-peak; 7-10 minutes peak hours	12-15 minutes off-peak; 9-11 minutes peak hours	50 minutes
287P	Santo André Oeste	Piraporinha	9-15 minutes off-peak; 5-8 minutes peak hours	12-15 minutes offpeak; 10-12 minutes peak hours	No service	30 minutes
288	Ferrazópolis	Jabaquara	10-30 minutes off-peak; 4-6 minutes peak hours	20-55 minutes off-peak; 9-15 minutes peak hours	15-30 minutes off-peak; 9-10 minutes peak hours	50 minutes
288P	Ferrazópolis	Piraporinha	8-14 minutes off-peak; 6-11 minutes peak hours	15-20 minutes off-peak; 12-13 minutes peak hours	No service	25 minutes
289	Piraporinha	Jabaquara	6-7 minutes off-peak; 4-6 minutes peak hours	13-20 minutes off-peak; 7-9 minutes peak hours	15-20 minutes off-peak; 15 minutes peak hours	32 minutes
290	Diadema	Jabaquara	7-11 minutes off-peak; 3-8 minutes peak hours	10-17 minutes off-peak; 7-11 minutes peak hours	15 minutes off-peak; 10-14 minutes peak hours	10 minutes
487	Sônia Maria	Santa Tereza	16-30 minutes off-peak; 13-20 minutes peak hours	No service	No service	33 minutes

Source: ABD corridor lines and timetables

=== Fares and fare collection ===
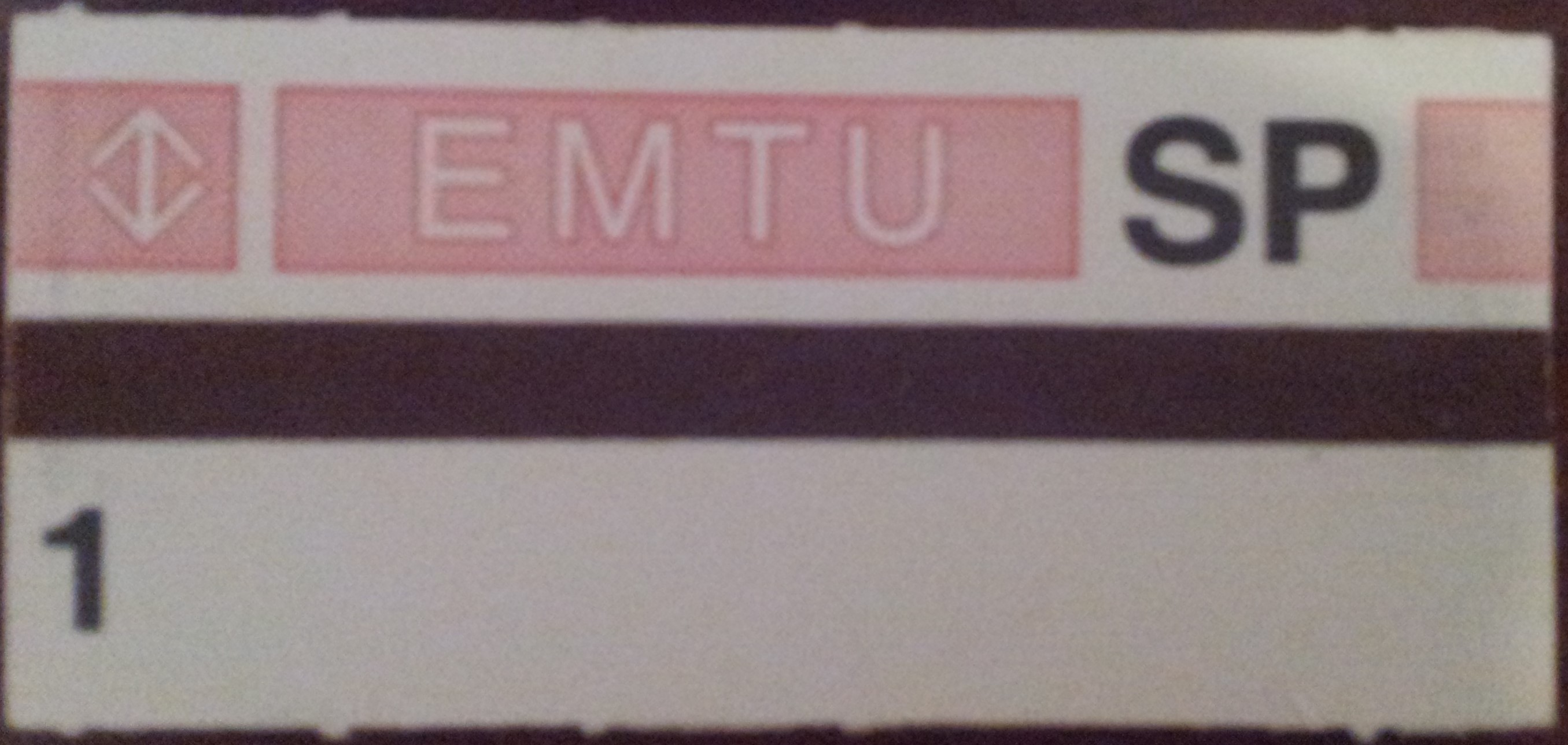
A single-ride magnetic ticket employed in the system in 2014. Note the São Paulo Metro logo is still shown in the upper left corner.

As of April 2014, the basic fare for a single-ride was R$ 3.20. Historically the fare was the same amount as in the São Paulo Metro and CPTM commuter rail systems, but the 2013 demonstrations in Brazil changed that policy as rail transportation fares were rolled back to R$3.00. Students and teachers were eligible for a 50% discounted fare provided they attend a school within the system embracing area. Seniors (people over age 65) and handicapped people unable to work may transit free of charge after a specific enrollment procedure.

Fares are collected in buses (which are equipped with turnstiles) at the stops and termini turnstiles, before passengers' admission. Infrequent customers may buy a magnetic ticket to ride the system (an Edmondson ticket). Daily commuters often employ the BOM card (Cartão BOM) - an abbreviation for Bilhete Ônibus Metropolitano, Metropolitan Bus Ticket, compiling a word meaning good in Portuguese - a smartcard allowing access to the buses and the state rail transportation as well. Special integration fares were offered for customers using São Paulo Metro or CPTM commuter rail systems, through the acquisition of a combined ticket costing R$5.80.

=== Fleet ===
Vehicles employed in the operation include diesel-fueled buses, trolleybuses, hybrid and battery-powered buses. Some are articulated and/or low-floor units.

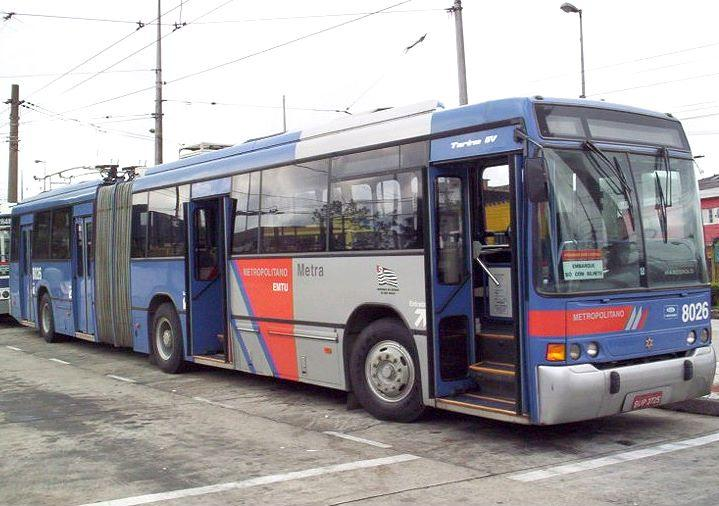
Marcopolo articulated trolleybus no. 8026

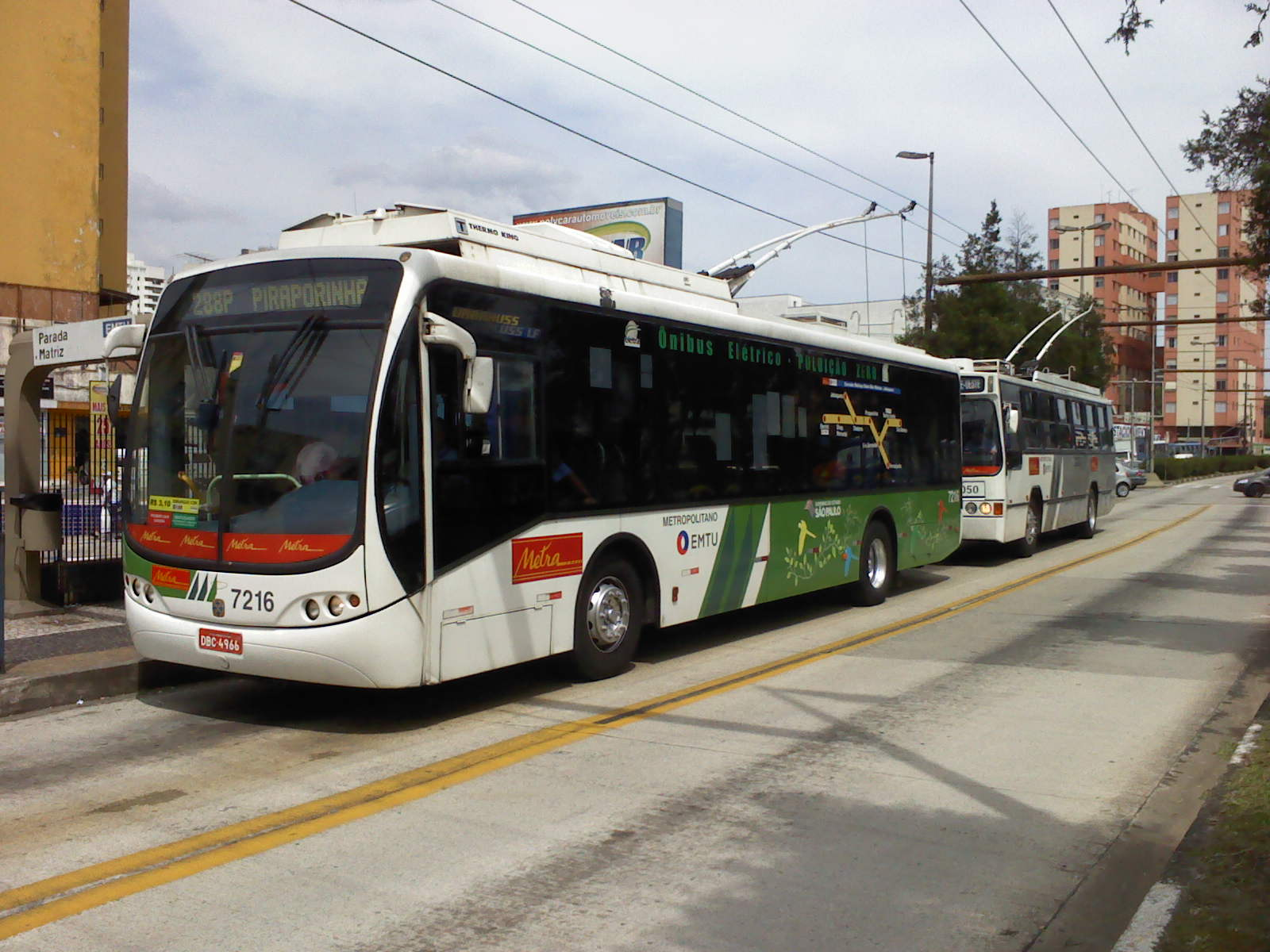
Busscar low-floor trolleybus no. 7216

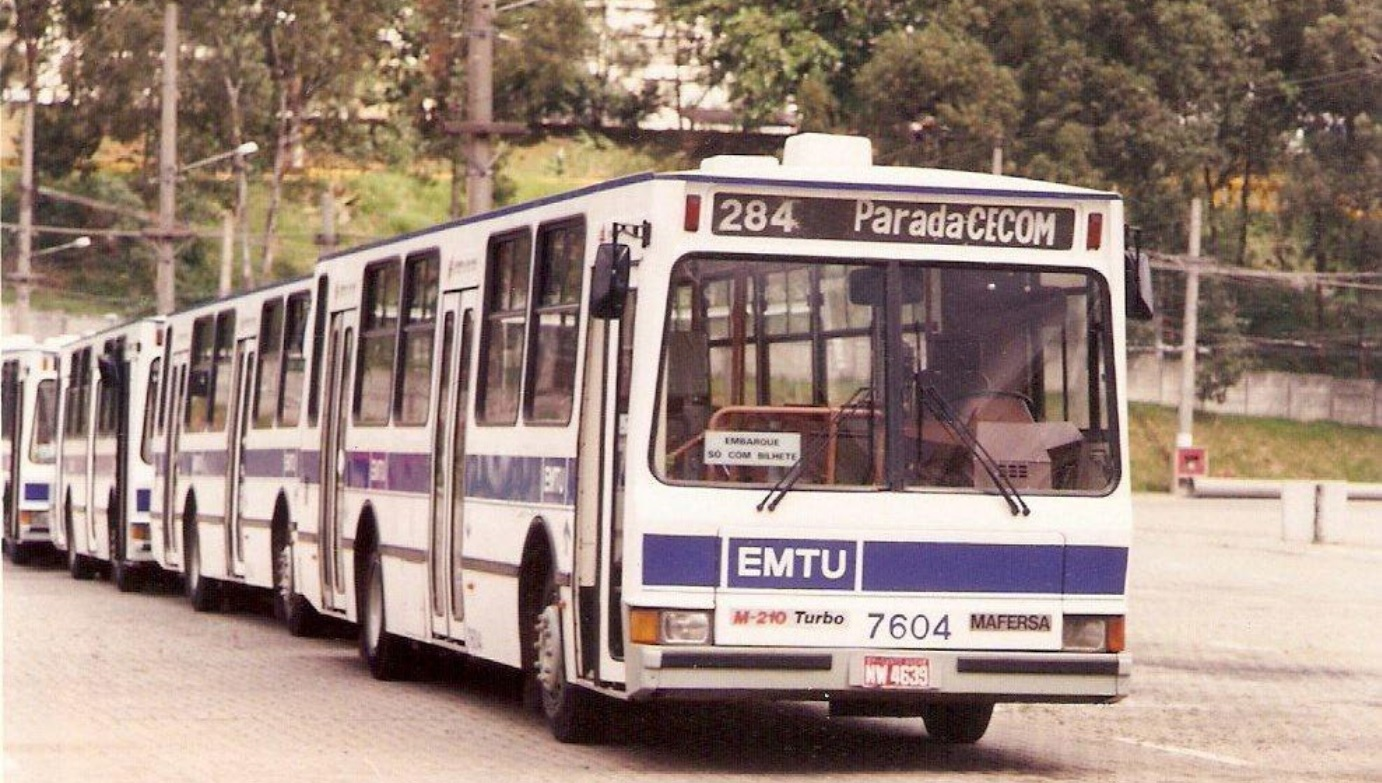
Mafersa trolleybuses lined up near the Center of Control, Operations and Maintenance, 1989

== Classification as a BRT ==
Although Brazil hosted the first bus system recognized as a BRT at Curitiba, beginning in the 1970s, the term was not widespread in the country until the nomination for the 2014 FIFA World Cup, when several prospective host cities announced plans to establish such systems as part of the infrastructure works initially intended to serve the event. (As the event approached, many of those projects - including expressways and light rail transit systems - were cancelled or postponed.) The Institute for Transportation and Development Policy classified the system as a Bronze-standard BRT in the 2013 Corridor Ranking.

== Diadema - São Paulo Extension ==
An extension branch to the system was proposed, connecting Diadema terminal to the Brooklin neighborhood in São Paulo. Such extension was referred as Diadema-Brooklin corridor and began construction in 1986. The project suffered setbacks, including lack of funding, civil actions questioning the public bidding process, as well as challenging drainage works. Effective operation started in 2000, although the corridor works were not ready, with a single line service employing midibuses. The complete path was completed in 2010, which allowed the replacement of midibuses with large capacity vehicles. A shuttle service was initiated linking Morumbi and Berrini stations, both of them providing connections to Line 9 - Emerald CPTM stations. As a consequence the branch became called the Diadema-Berrini extension.

=== Lines ===
Diadema - São Paulo Extension Lines
#	Departure	Arrival	Weekdays headway	Saturday headway	Sunday headway	Travel time
376	Diadema	Berrini	9–30 minutes	15–28 minutes	20–40 minutes	55 minutes
376M	Diadema	Morumbi	6-12 minutes off-peak; 3-5 minutes peak hours	20–28 minutes	30–40 minutes	35 minutes

Source: ABD corridor lines and timetables

== Interference with future projects ==
The São Paulo metropolitan transportation network expansion plan foresaw the need for a metro line linking southern São Paulo to the ABC region, expected with the line 18 implementation. The first sketched project claimed for a line from CPTM Tamanduateí Station in São Paulo up to Alvarengas Station in São Bernardo do Campo (as an elevated monorail). Such path overlaps the Ferrazópolis-São Bernardo branch of the BRT, and the design of the line suggests its suppression in favor of the rapid transit structure and a city-owned bus corridor. Such a proposal showed two setbacks: the need to partially terminate the contract with the system operator (thus requiring a compensation fee), and the suppression of a successful transportation mode (measured in Pkm). Those risks endangered the whole monorail project, and drove the São Paulo government to split its implementation, in favor of building the branch from Tamanduateí to Djalma Dutra (a station in São Bernardo) only. The latest transportation map depicted the continuation of São Bernardo-Ferrazópolis branch as well as line 18 "in construction", although effective work on that metro line weren't started (although the Portuguese legend in the map shows the segment as "under implementation", a more accurate status rather than "under construction").
