= Scomi Rail =

Malaysian railway manufacturing company

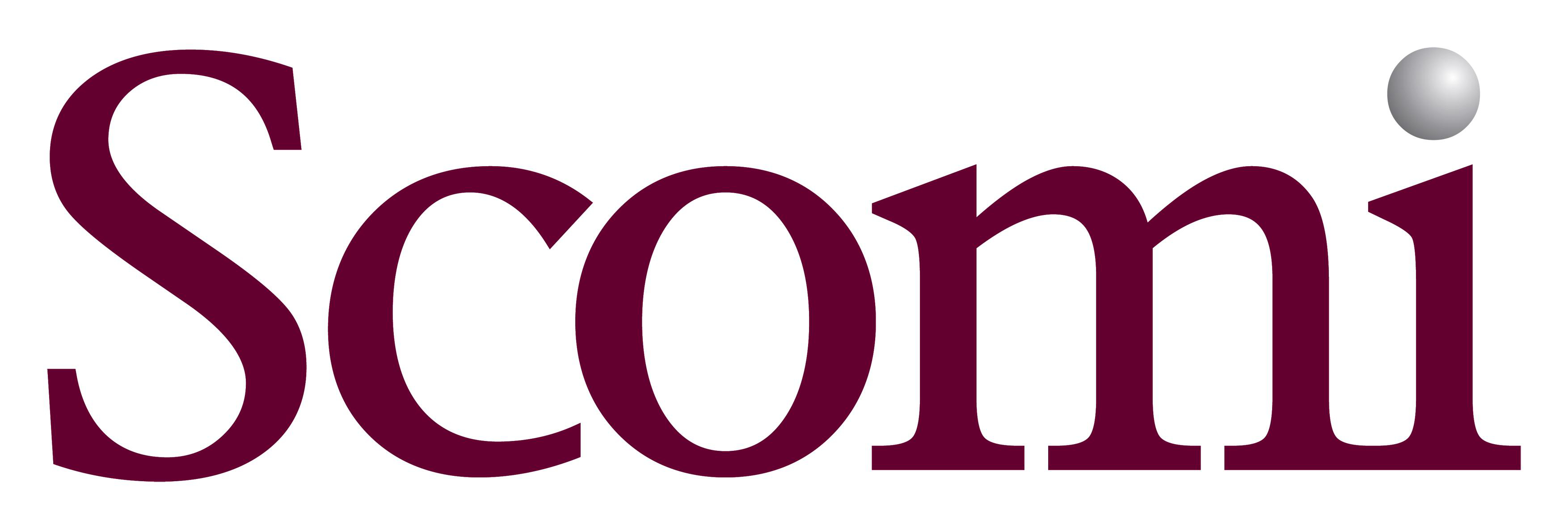
- Type: Subsidiary
- Industry: Rail vehicle manufacturing
- Predecessor: MTrans
- Founded: 1997; 29 years ago
- Defunct: 2019; 7 years ago
- Fate: Dissolved due to a receivership
- Headquarters: Klang Valley, Malaysia
- Area served: Various
- Key people: Rohaida Ali Badaruddin (Chief Executive Officer)
- Products: Monorails; Communication systems Electrical systems
- Services: Monorail system integration
- Parent: Scomi Group
- Website: scomirail.com.my

Scomi Rail, formerly MTrans and Monorail Malaysia, was a Malaysian rail system manufacturer specializing in monorails. A subsidiary of Scomi Group, the company was one of the world's three leading providers of monorail systems, and one of only four globally recognized integrated monorail system providers, meaning that apart from manufacturing rolling stock, it also provided equipment like communication systems, electro-mechanical systems and services such as system integration and project management.

In 2019 Scomi Rail was placed in receivership and it is no longer selling its monorail system.

== History ==
In 1997, the Monorail Malaysia project started as the Kuala Lumpur Monorail project. The Asian Economic Crisis of 1998 almost derailed the project completely, due to a huge increase in the price of the Japanese-built imported trains caused by the devaluation of the Malaysian Ringgit, forcing the government to look at alternative solutions. In 1998, the decision was made to cancel plans to import Japanese trains and to produce them locally instead.

Following the crisis, Monorail Malaysia was formed and prototype of its monorail was completed in a 3-month period and tests began in August 1999 on a 100m test track at the Monorail Malaysia Technology (MMT) plant. In the following two and a half years, improvements were made to the vehicle, and the first production vehicle was completed in April 2001. The Malaysian-made system utilized substantial local content for its components and was able to realize a 50% cost savings over the Japanese system. Malaysia Monorail was later renamed MTrans, which opened the completed Kuala Lumpur Monorail in 2003.

In 2007, Scomi bought Mtrans in a deal worth RM25mil and renamed it to the current Scomi Rail.

On 2 November 2007, Scomi Rail unveiled the Generation 2 Scomi SUTRA monorail design, which has now become Scomi Rail's main product.

In 2008, Scomi Rail established its Engineering, Technology and Innovation Centre, which also houses Scomi's Research and Development Centre.

The financial trouble of Scomi lead to non-performance in manufacturing the monorail rolling stock for the São Paulo Metro Monorail lines leading to the contract being terminated in 2019.

== Facilities ==
=== Engineering, Technology and Innovation Centre ===
Scomi Rail's main monorail manufacturing plant is the ISO 9001 certified Engineering, Technology and Innovation Centre located at the Rawang Industrial Park, located 30 km from Kuala Lumpur, Malaysia's capital city. The RM30 million center built in 2008 has a 12-station monorail assembly line and a 16-station Electrical Multiple Unit assembly line. Each assembly line is capable of producing a rail carbody every 5 to 7 days. The facility has the capacity to produce 500 monorail cars a year. The facility also houses Scomi Rail's Research and Development Centre.

The facility is equipped with high-tech equipment necessary for various manufacturing needs, including a 5-face machining center, various cutting machines including a 3D laser-cutter, electrical discharge machine, Mazak lathes, milling systems, plastic injection machine, robotic arm welding center and a variety of metal working machines.

In addition, the manufacturing facility is surrounded by a 1-km monorail test track where prototypes and finished products can be tested for quality control.

== Rolling stock ==
=== Scomi SUTRA ===
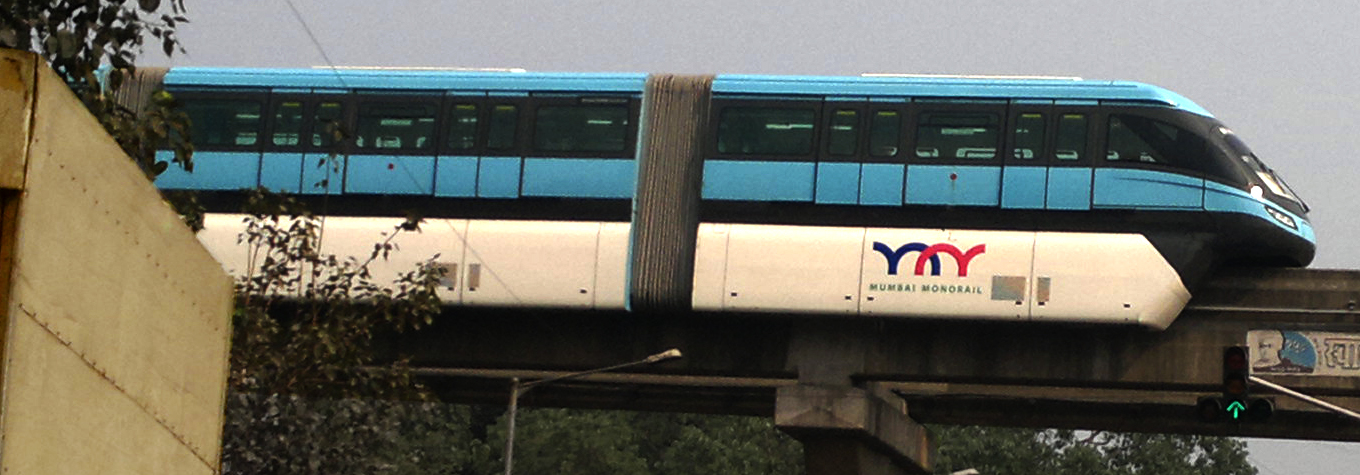
Scomi SUTRA operated by Mumbai Monorail which was Scomi Rail's first overseas project

The Scomi SUTRA is a monorail system designed by Scomi Rail at a development cost of around RM35mil. The SUTRA is Scomi Rail's main monorail design and is currently used in all of Scomi Rail's projects.

The SUTRA was designed in 2006-2007 and was first used in Scomi Rail's first overseas project, the Mumbai Monorail.

The SUTRA is a highly customisable design, and is designed to accommodate 2 to 8 cars per set, with capacity ranging from 6,400 pphpd in the 4-car KL Monorail to 36,000 in the 5/6 car Line 17 (São Paulo Metro) and Manaus Monorail.

=== Future ===
Currently, Generation 3 monorails (successor to the SUTRA) and MRT-type trains are under development by Scomi Rail as future products.

The future four-car trains will be designed to fit 900 passengers compared to the current Putra LRT four-car trains that have a capacity of 740 passengers.

== Monorail projects ==
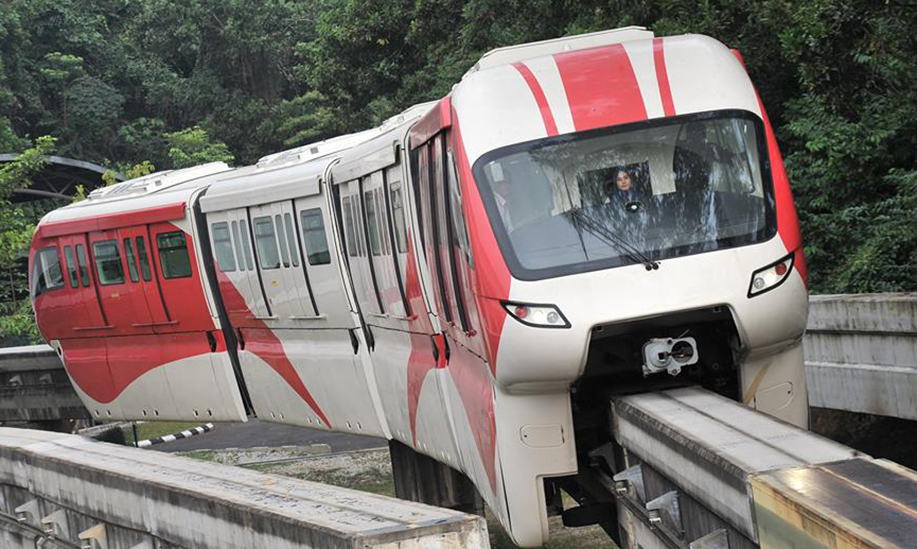
KL Monorail, Scomi Rail's first ever project pictured with new SUTRA trainsets

Scomi Engineering won a RM1.84bil bid in 2008 to build a monorail project in Mumbai with its Indian partner Larsen & Toubro. Its share of the job was RM823mil and projected margins were between 10% and 20%. The Mumbai project was Scomi Rail's first international project, and signified the start of Scomi Rail's international expansion in monorail manufacturing.

=== Operational ===
- KL Monorail - Kuala Lumpur, Malaysia
- Mumbai Monorail - Mumbai, India

=== Cancelled Order ===
- Line 17 (São Paulo Metro) - São Paulo, Brazil
- Line 18 (São Paulo Metro) - São Paulo, Brazil

=== Formerly proposed ===
- Colombo Monorail - Colombo, Sri Lanka
- Manaus Monorail - Manaus, Brazil
- Chennai Monorail - Chennai, India
- Kanpur Monorail - Kanpur, India
