= Line 18 (São Paulo Metro) =

São Paulo Metro Line 18 (Bronze)

Overview
- Status: Cancelled
- Owner: Government of the State of São Paulo
- Locale: São Paulo; São Caetano do Sul; Santo André; São Bernardo do Campo
- Termini: Tamanduateí; Estrada dos Alvarengas
- Stations: 19

Service
- Type: Straddle beam monorail
- System: São Paulo Metro
- Operator: Vem ABC
- Depots: Tamanduateí rail yard; Alvarengas rail yard
- Daily ridership: 314,000 (estimated)

Technical
- Character: Elevated
- Track gauge: None (monorail)
- Electrification: 750 V DC contact rails on the side of the beam

Line 18 (Bronze) (Portuguese: Linha 18–Bronze) was a project of the São Paulo Metro. It would link São Paulo to the southeast portion of the Greater São Paulo, ending in São Bernardo do Campo. The line was expected to be the first São Paulo Metro Line to go beyond the city limits.

== Stations ==
Code	Station	Platforms	Position	Connections	City
TBA	Tamanduateí	Island platform	Elevated	Line 2 (São Paulo Metro)	São Paulo
TBA	Vila Carioca	Island platform	Elevated	-	São Paulo
TBA	Goiás	Island platform	Elevated	-	São Caetano do Sul
TBA	Espaço Cerâmica	Island platform	Elevated	-	São Caetano do Sul
TBA	Estrada das Lágrimas	Island platform	Elevated	-	São Caetano do Sul
TBA	Praça Regina Matiello	Island platform	Elevated	-	Santo André
TBA	Instituto Mauá	Island platform	Elevated	-	Santo André
TBA	Afonsina	Island platform	Elevated	-	Santo André
TBA	Fundação Santo André	Island platform	Elevated	-	Santo André
TBA	Winston Churchill	Island platform	Elevated	-	Santo André
TBA	Senador Vergueiro	Island platform	Elevated	-	Santo André
TBA	Baeta Neves	Island platform	Elevated	-	São Bernardo do Campo
TBA	Paço Municipal	Island platform	Elevated	São Bernardo do Campo Metropolitan Terminal; São Mateus–Jabaquara Metropolitan Corridor	São Bernardo do Campo
TBA	Djalma Dutra	Island platform	Elevated	-	São Bernardo do Campo
TBA	Praça Lauro Gomes	Island platform	Elevated	-	São Bernardo do Campo
TBA	Ferrazópolis	Island platform	Elevated	Ferrazópolis Metropolitan Terminal; São Mateus–Jabaquara Metropolitan Corridor	São Bernardo do Campo
TBA	Café Filho	Island platform	Elevated	-	São Bernardo do Campo
TBA	Capitão Casa	Island platform	Elevated	-	São Bernardo do Campo
TBA	Estrada dos Alvarengas	Island platform	Elevated	-	São Bernardo do Campo

== Background ==
Preliminary studies for a city passenger rail transportation system in São Paulo were sketched as of 1888, and later some of them included the so-called ABC region. One of them cited a suspension railway as an alternative for the city and its neighborhoods in the 1960s, inspired on Wuppertal Suspension Railway and SAFEGE models, including a suggestion to link ABC to Parque Dom Pedro II through Tamanduateí River. São Paulo Metro was established as a company in 1968 and started its revenue service in 1974. Its justification was based upon the fast growth of the city of São Paulo, and its car fleet as well, with all the problems emerging due to that. The original plan suggested the construction of four lines, all of them enclosed within the city's limits, although predicting transfer stations to the commuter rail system and the buses. The southeasternmost station of the system was predicted to be settled near Via Anchieta (and bearing such name), a state road linking São Paulo to Santos passing by the ABC region. Although commuter rail services exist between the ABC region and the city of São Paulo since the end of the 19th century, through São Paulo Railway and its successors, the fast growth of the area observed in the 2nd half of the 20th century and the unavailability of such services in some cities (notably São Bernardo do Campo and Diadema) demanded further transport options to the region. At first the government didn't see any rationale to establish a metro line in the area, choosing to install a trolley bus service linking São Paulo to São Bernardo do Campo through Diadema. Such initiatives led to the establishment of São Mateus–Jabaquara Metropolitan Corridor, one of the first bus rapid transit systems in Brazil.

The São Paulo secretariat of Metropolitan Transportation started to issue plans for the future transport expansion in 1997, aiming to anticipate and get prepared for the demands of its citizens on this matter. Those reports are known as Integrated Urban Transport Plans (Plano Integrado de Transporte Urbano – PITU). PITU 2025 claimed for the need to a metro branch linking ABC to São Paulo, more specifically employing either a light rail or guided bus technology.

== Project ==
The original project predicted an 18 stops' line linking the current Tamanduateí station (already served by São Paulo Metro and CPTM commuter rail service as well) to Alvarengas station, a future terminal station to be located near the city road bearing the same name. However parts of such path overlaps the current São Mateus–Jabaquara metropolitan corridor, which would demand the extinction of such service between São Bernardo and Ferrazópolis. As this corridor is operated through a concession, it would imply breaking that contract thus exposing the state government to a termination fee. Such risk endangered the whole project and the solution sought was to truncate the proposed line to end at São Bernardo station and eventually at Djalma Dutra station.

The government procurement for the establishment of the line has been established in 2014 and states it will be constructed as a public–private partnership. The system is expected to be concluded in 2018. Stations Rudge Ramos and Mauá are shown as Praça Regina Matiello and Instituto Mauá, respectively, in some local news sources, although the most recent metro company documents still don't mention them bearing such names.

In July 2014, Malaysian rail company Scomi Rail announced that it had been selected as the monorail technology provider for the winning consortium of the Public Private Partnership Project (PPP), Consorcio ABC Integrado. This would be Scomi's third project in Brazil after Line 17-Gold and the Manaus Monorail. The line will operate the Scomi SUTRA monorail systems designed by Scomi Rail.

In July 2020, more than a year after the cancelling of the project, Chinese company BYD presented a proposal to the State Secretary of Regional Development, along with the Chairman of the Greater ABC Intermunicipal Dealership, Gabriel Maranhão, Mayor of Rio Grande da Serra, to "rescue" the monorail line.

== Controversy ==
The monorail alternative for line 18 was contested, as it is not employed on current metro branches but appointed as the most suitable construction for this project, as well as for lines 15-Silver (formerly Line 2-Green expansion) and 17-Gold. Positive arguments are the cheaper, faster construction and decreasing the need for resumption; listed setbacks are visual pollution, difficulty to be evacuated in case of emergency, its relative small capacity and incapability to be upgraded. In downtown São Bernardo do Campo, some real estate owners tried to settle a civil action to change the proposed right-of-way, as it may adversely affect high-end apartment buildings recently erected there, through aesthetic concerns and planned resumptions. On 3 July 2019, Governor João Doria, along with Vice Governor, Rodrigo Garcia, and Secretary of Metropolitan Transportations, Alexandre Baldy, announced that the Line would be cancelled and replaced by a BRT system, already rumored months before.
