= List of public transport routes numbered 18 =

In public transport, Route 18 may refer to:

- Route 18 (Baltimore streetcar), a former streetcar in Baltimore, Maryland
- London Buses route 18

== See also ==
- Line 18 (disambiguation)
