= Manaus Monorail =

Overview
- Status: Planned
- Locale: Manaus (Amazonas, Brazil)
- Coordinates: 3°07′33.6″S 60°01′14.4″W
- Stations: 9

Service
- Type: Monorail

Technical
- Line length: 20 km (12 mi)
- Character: Elevated

Manaus Monorail (Portuguese: Monotrilho de Manaus) is a 20 kilometres (12 mi) straddle monorail unfinished for construction in the Brazilian city of Manaus. In February 2012, the Infrastructure Secretariat of Amazonas signed a contract with a consortium of CR Almedia, Mendes Junior, Serveng and Malaysian rail company Scomi Rail for the construction of the monorail. As of 2018, construction has yet to begin.

== History ==
Announced in August 2011, the line would run from Largo da Matriz to Jorge Teixeira, serving nine stations. It is designed to carry up to 35 000 passengers/h per direction. Completion was scheduled for 2014, though it has been delayed. Scomi Rail will supply 10 six-car SUTRA trainsets and depot equipment, as well as track switches, a maintenance vehicle, system integration and project management.

== Route ==
Station	Inauguration	City ward	Connections
Matriz	planned	Centro	
Constantino Nery	planned	Nossa Senhora das Graças	
São Jorge	planned	São Jorge	
Arena Amazônia	planned	Flores	
Santos Dumont	planned	Da Paz	
Manoa	planned	Cidade Nova	
Cidade Nova	planned	Cidade Nova	
Francisca Mendes	planned	Francisca Mendes	
Jorge Teixeira	planned	Jorge Teixeira	Bus Terminal 4
