= Kanpur Monorail =

Proposed public transport in Kanpur

Overview
- Owner: Government of Uttar Pradesh
- Locale: Kanpur, Uttar Pradesh
- Transit type: Monorail
- Number of lines: 3 (planned)
- Daily ridership: 35,000 (Estd.)
- Headquarters: Monorail

Operation
- Train length: 4 coaches

Technical
- Electrification: 750 V DC
- Average speed: 31 km/h (19 mph)
- Top speed: 80 km/h (50 mph)

The Kanpur Monorail was a proposed monorail system for the city of Kanpur.

== Lines ==
There are three lines proposed in phase I are as follows:

- From Panki Sector 18 to Shuklaganj via Govind Puri – Jarib Chauki – Central – Ghantaghar 8 Point – Shuklaganj. Length of this line would be 24.5 km
- From Chobepur to Maharajpur via IIT Kanpur – Kalyanpur – Rawatpur – Kanpur Anwarganj – Kanpur Central. Length of this line would be 28.5 km
- From Kanpur Zoo to Kanpur Cantonment via Old Kanpur – Civil Lines – Wazid Pur. Length of this line would be 16.0 km

Total length of Phase I would be 63.0 km.

=== Other lines ===
Other lines which are being proposed in addition to Phase I are:

- From Daheli Sujanpur to Govind Nagar.
- From J K Temple to Kidwai Nagar via Kamla Club – Govindpuri.
- From Gangotri Township to Sahara City via Green Park Stadium – Rave 3 – Old Kanpur – New Kanpur City

== Status ==
Feasibility study has been completed for Phase I corridors. Work was predicted to start after 2016. As of 2021 no work has commenced.

In 2016 the State Government approved the rail based Kanpur Metro, which began construction in 2021. It is not clear if the metro corridors will replace the monorail plans.
