= Scomi SUTRA =

Malaysian electric monorail train system

Scomi Urban Transit Rail Application
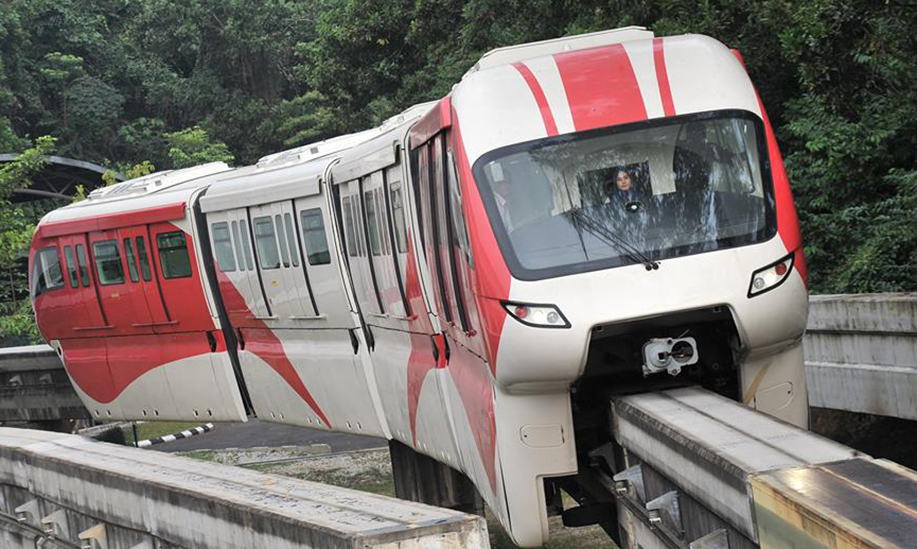
- 4-car SUTRA trainsets used by KL Monorail

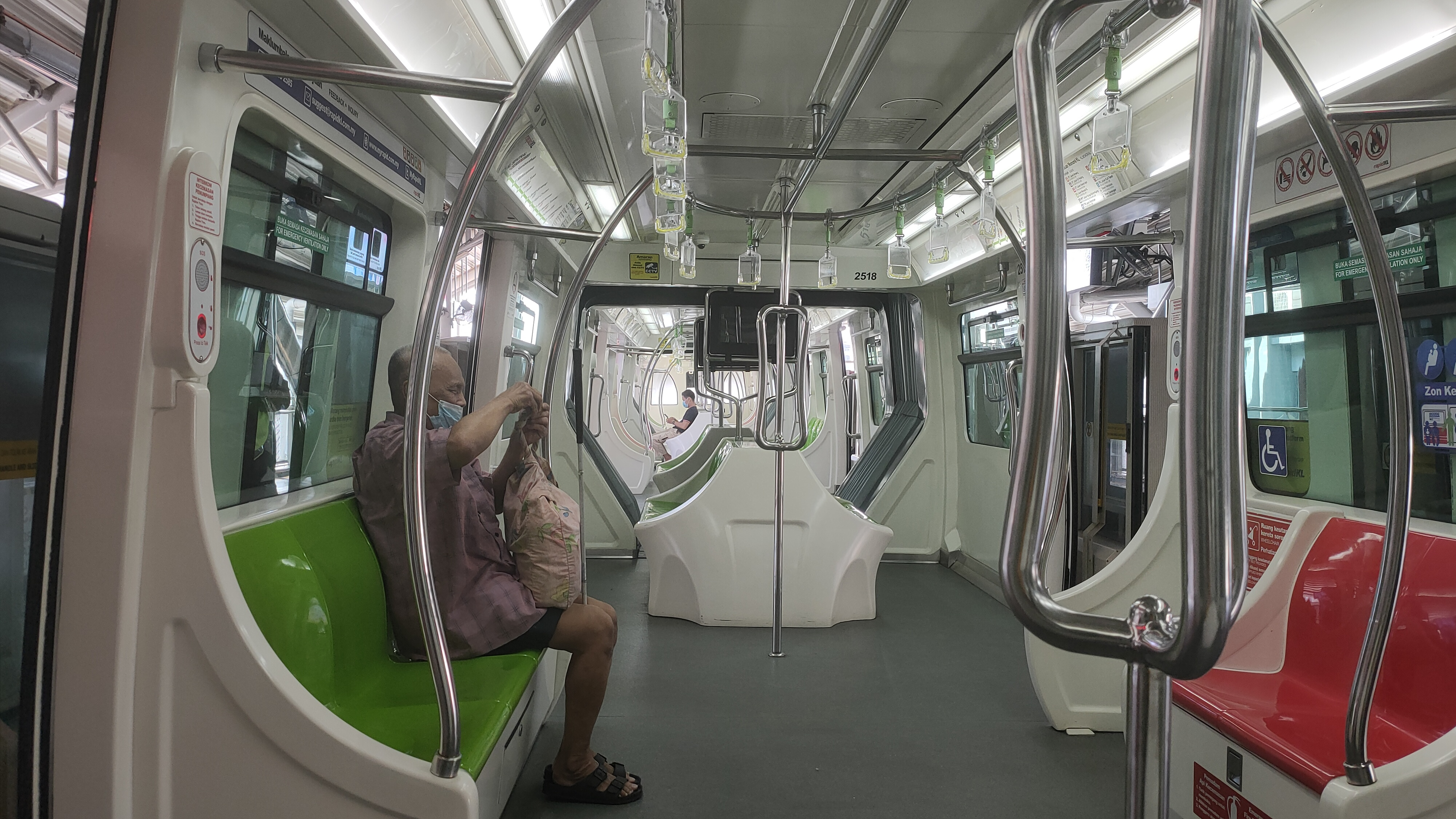
- The interior of a SUTRA unit
- In service: 2012–
- Manufacturer: Scomi Rail
- Built at: Rawang Industrial Park
- Formation: 2–8 car sets
- Capacity: 20/139 (seated/standing) per car
- Operators: Rapid KL (Kuala Lumpur); Mumbai Monorail

Specifications
- Train length: 2 car: 23.7 m (77 ft 9 in); 4 car: 45.4 m (148 ft 11 in); 6 car: 67 m (219 ft 10 in)
- Car length: 11.2 m (36 ft 9 in) (end cars); 9.5 m (31 ft 2 in) (intermediate cars)
- Width: 3.08 m (10 ft 1 in) (incl. doors)
- Height: 4.72 m (15 ft 6 in)
- Floor height: 2.1 m (6 ft 11 in)
- Doors: 2 pairs per side
- Wheel diameter: 940 mm (37 in)
- Maximum speed: 90 km/h (56 mph)
- Weight: 15 tonnes per car
- Traction system: Variable frequency (Strukton SPIRC IGBT)
- Acceleration: 1.1 m/s^{2} (3.6 ft/s^{2})
- Deceleration: 1.1 m/s^{2} (3.6 ft/s^{2}) (service); 1.3 m/s^{2} (4.3 ft/s^{2}) (emergency)
- Electric systems: 750 V DC third rail
- Current collection: Contact shoe
- Braking systems: Regenerative and electro-pneumatic

SUTRA, abbreviation for Scomi Urban Transit Rail Application, is a monorail electrical multiple unit (EMU) type train system designed by Malaysian rail company Scomi Rail. The design is currently the main product offering of Scomi Rail, which has won several contracts with the design, with the first customer being the Mumbai Monorail project.

In 2019 Scomi Rail was placed in receivership and it is no longer selling its monorail system.

== Background ==
In late 2006, Scomi Rail decided to develop its own next generation monorail after gaining experience from the manufacture of the KL Monorail system. Within twelve months after commencing engineering design, on 26 November 2007, the SUTRA was unveiled by the then Malaysian deputy prime minister Datuk Seri Najib Tun Razak, who described the launch as "a significant milestone".

The total investment expenditure spent by Scomi Rail for the SUTRA monorail was about RM35mil including for research, development and factory expansion.

== Design ==
The SUTRA complies with 50 international standards comprising safety, quality assurance, vehicle certification, reliability, availability and maintainability.

Compared to the previous design used in the KL Monorail, the SUTRA has improved features such as a composite body and interior panel, new bogie system and structure, mass transit components drive train, improved propulsion and control system, and regenerative and pneumatic brake system. The SUTRA is also more energy-efficient due to an improved direct-drive propulsion system and lower vehicle weight. The SUTRA also has a smaller turning radius of 50m and can also handle gradients on a slope of up to six degrees. The SUTRA also features couplings for up to eight cars that have a capacity of 1,050 passengers.

=== General ===
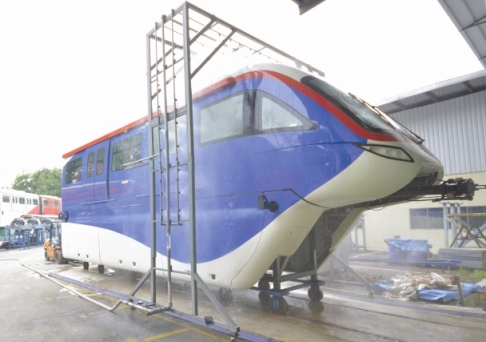
The Scomi SUTRA being manufactured

The SUTRA is a highly customisable design, and is designed to accommodate two to eight cars per set, with capacity ranging from 6,400 pphpd in the four-car KL Monorail to 36,000 in the 5/6-car Line 17 (São Paulo Metro) and Manaus Monorail.

The monocoque (load-bearing single-shell frame) body structure of the SUTRA is constructed with aluminium extrusion materials. The lightweight structure combined with the aluminium apron structure provides enhanced strength and durability of up to 30 years.

The SUTRA's propulsion is provided by an electric motor with gear reducers which draws power from the 750 V DC power line. The motor of the SUTRA is fitted with a variable-voltage-variable-frequency (VVVF) drive which is fine-tuned for smooth acceleration / deceleration. The VVVF has high torque and duty cycle capabilities, rated at a power of 200 kW.

The brake system consists of electro-pneumatic systems and regenerative brakes, providing multiple uses including high integrity emergency brakes, service brakes, security brakes and parking brakes.

The SUTRA has an automatic coupling system that can connect up to eight cars together. The coupling system is also capable of towing another SUTRA during emergency connections and is also designed to absorb impact energy in case of accidents.

=== Interior ===
The interior of the SUTRA is customisable, and was designed with the consideration of passenger safety and comfort. It was designed with a minimalist concept with the aim of increased interior space and maximised flow of passengers and minimised obstruction in and around doorways.

Hand rails and stanchions are available to assist safe boarding, seating, standing and alighting assistance, including for persons with disabilities. Other safety features include an emergency door release knob and emergency passenger intercom as well as emergency ventilation windows.

The flooring of the SUTRA is slip-resistant and made of fire-retardant material. Each car has a 40 kW roof-mounted air conditioning unit. Passenger information systems include LED texts and television screens in addition to audio announcements.

The cabs are equipped with specially designed mass transit seats and two adjacent flippable seats as well as a disabled wheelchair area, which also functions as a standing area when not utilised. Similar to the previous generation Scomi monorails, there are center seats which also function as bogie covers.

=== Vehicle management ===
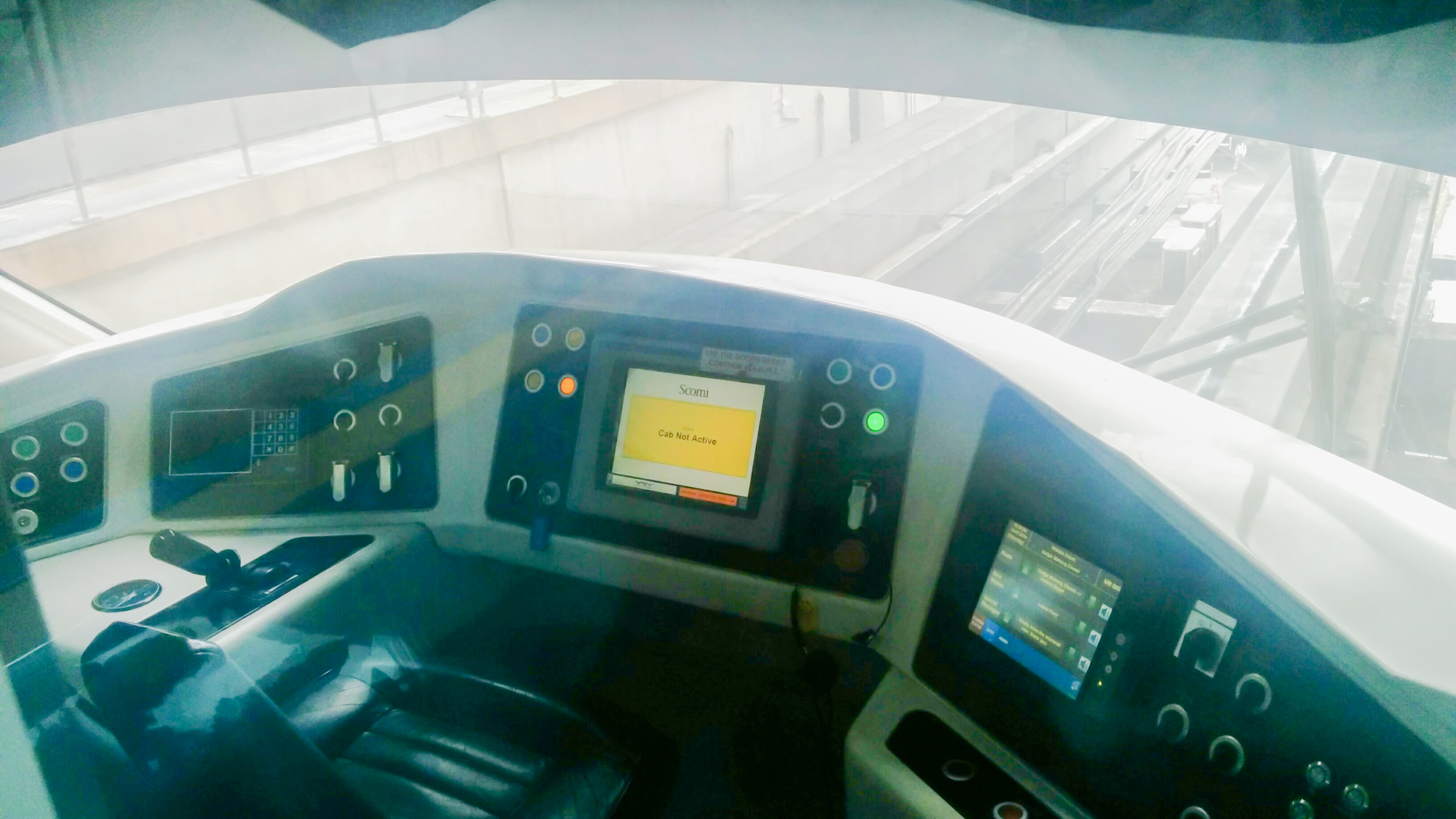
Driver's cab of the SUTRA with the vehicle management system visible

The vehicle management system (VMS) provides supervised control, monitoring and diagnostic systems for train operators.

Train status information is graphically displayed to the operator via the HMI panel. The user-friendly interface display allows the operator to quickly respond and understand all train system status.

The train system status and abnormal conditions are categorised and displayed in real time and prioritised in order of critical system hierarchy. As an option, critical data can be logged for further analysis.

The train is equipped with automatic train protection (ATP) system to prevent collisions. The ATP system can be optionally upgraded to an automatic train operation (ATO) system to automate operations of the monorail.

== Users ==
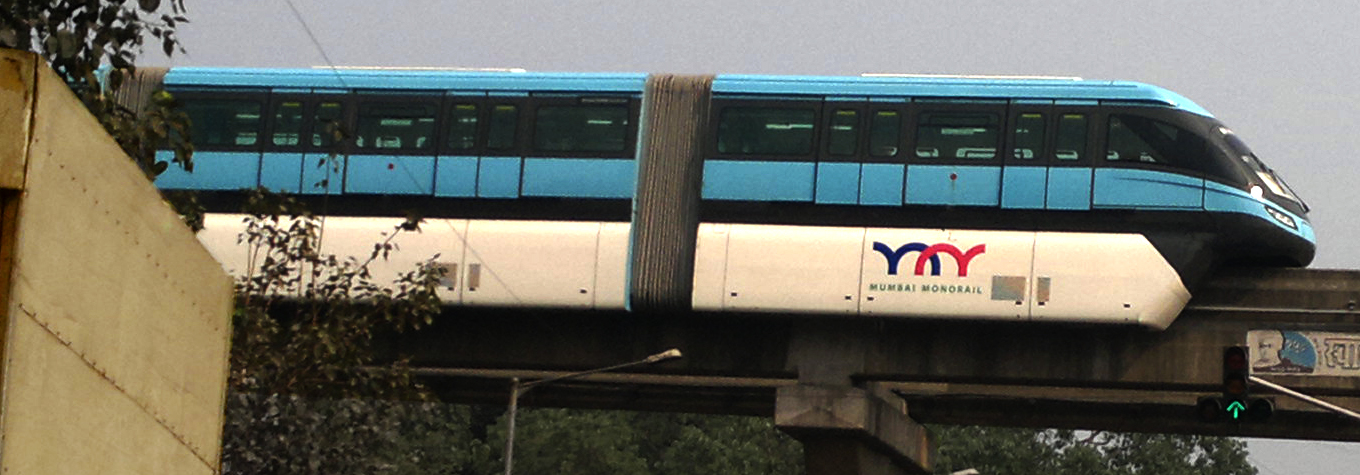
SUTRA's first user, the Mumbai Monorail

=== Operational ===
- KL Monorail – Kuala Lumpur, Malaysia
  - Quantity: 12 units of 4-car sets on order. Only 6 units delivered. All 6 were taken out of service in May 2017 due to safety reason.
  - Capacity: 6,400 pphpd
- Mumbai Monorail - Mumbai, India
  - Quantity: 16 units of 4-car sets
  - Capacity: 10,000 pphpd

=== Contracted ===
a contract was signed in 2012 but the project never began construction

- Manaus Monorail – Manaus, Brazil
  - Quantity: 10 units of 6-car sets
  - Capacity: 36,000 pphpd. On hold.

=== Cancelled ===
- Line 17 (São Paulo Metro) – São Paulo, Brazil Contract with Scomi terminated for non-performance in 2019, awarding to BYD instead.
  - Quantity: 24 units of 3-car sets upgradeable to 18 units of 5-car sets
  - Capacity: 36,000 pphpd
- Line 18 (São Paulo Metro) – São Paulo, Brazil
  - Quantity: Unconfirmed number of 5-car sets. Line cancelled.
  - Capacity: 21,000 pphpd
