= Cidade Nova (Manaus) =

Neighbourhood in Amazonas, Brazil

Cidade Nova (New Town)
- Neighbourhood
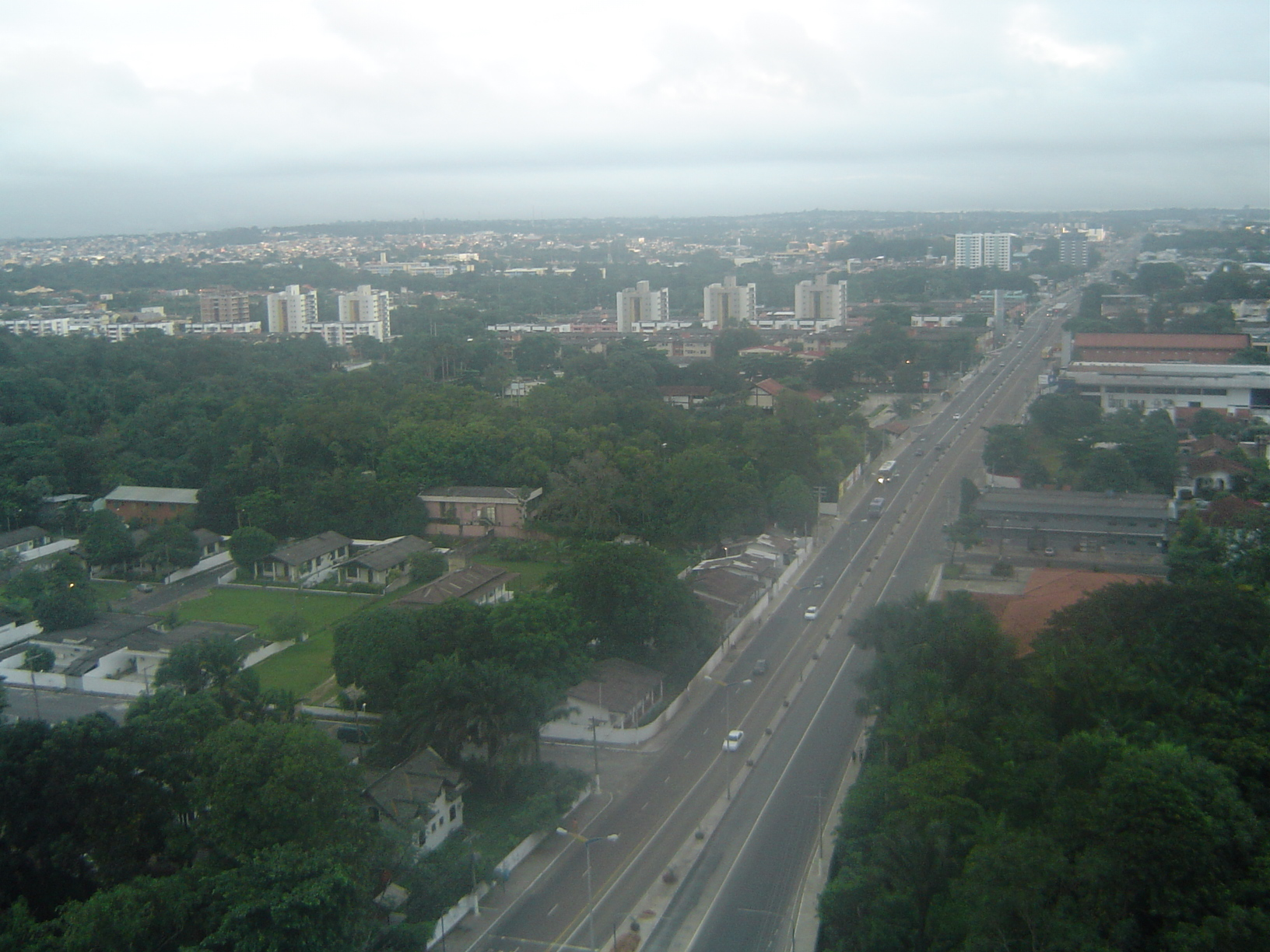
- Cidade Nova Road, which connects the entire Northern Zone of Manaus to the center of the city.

- Location in Brazil
- Coordinates: 3.0362681°S 59.9854831°W
- Country: Brazil
- Region: North
- State: Amazonas
- Municipality: Manaus
- Administrative Zone: North Zone

Cidade Nova ("New Town") is a neighborhood in the North Zone of Manaus, Amazonas. It has a population of over 300,000 inhabitants, making it the most populated district in Manaus.

== Overview ==
It is one of the most developed neighborhoods in the city in recent times and is considered a gastronomic and entertainment center of the capital. In addition, the neighborhood is marked by its high Human Development Index (HDI). It can also be used for large green spaces, beautiful gardens, various condominiums, leisure areas, large computer companies, communication and advertising agencies, as well as numerous companies. It is one of the main neighborhoods of the city, one of the largest in territorial territory and population. It is also one of the only manual districts that have autonomous neighborhoods, that is, neighborhoods and independent nuclei, with schools, churches and complete infrastructure. The neighborhood is divided into 24 nuclei organized in a numeral form.

Located in the convergence between the Center and the North Zone, the neighborhood is growing rapidly and attracting the upper class, coming from other neighborhoods, and the emerging upper middle class, from other neighborhoods.
