= The Federal Kuala Lumpur =

Hotel in Kuala Lumpur, Malaysia

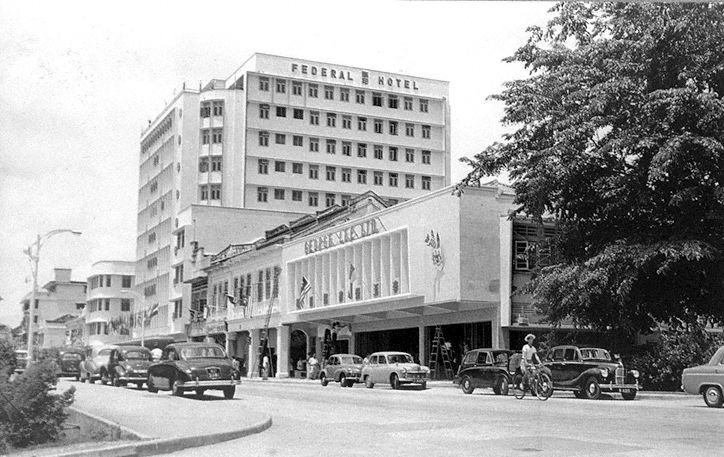
- The Federal Hotel on Bukit Bintang road, c. 1960s
- Interactive map of the The Federal Kuala Lumpur area

General information
- Location: Bukit Bintang, Kuala Lumpur, Malaysia
- Opening: 28 August 1957
- Operator: Federal Hotels International

Design and construction
- Architect: Lee Yoon Thim (original building)

The Federal Kuala Lumpur is an international-class hotel located in Bukit Bintang, Kuala Lumpur, Malaysia. It hosts post-independence Malaya's first revolving restaurant.

== History ==
The Federal Kuala Lumpur is the first international-class hotel of post-independence Malaya. It was built to coincide with Malaya's Independence commemoration to serve as a hotel for witnessing foreign dignitaries. It opened for business just three days before Malaya's Independence Day which falls on 31 August 1957. It was founded by Low Yat (father of Low Yow Chuan). The architect of the original nine-story building was Lee Yoon Thim. The taller wing housing the revolving restaurant was built in the early 1960s.

== See also ==
- Shangri-La Kuala Lumpur
- Ritz-Carlton Kuala Lumpur
- JW Marriott Kuala Lumpur
- Bukit Bintang - Kuala Lumpur's designated retail district
