= Shopping in Kuala Lumpur =

Kuala Lumpur is well-known for its shopping scene.

Below contains names and descriptions of markets and shopping malls.

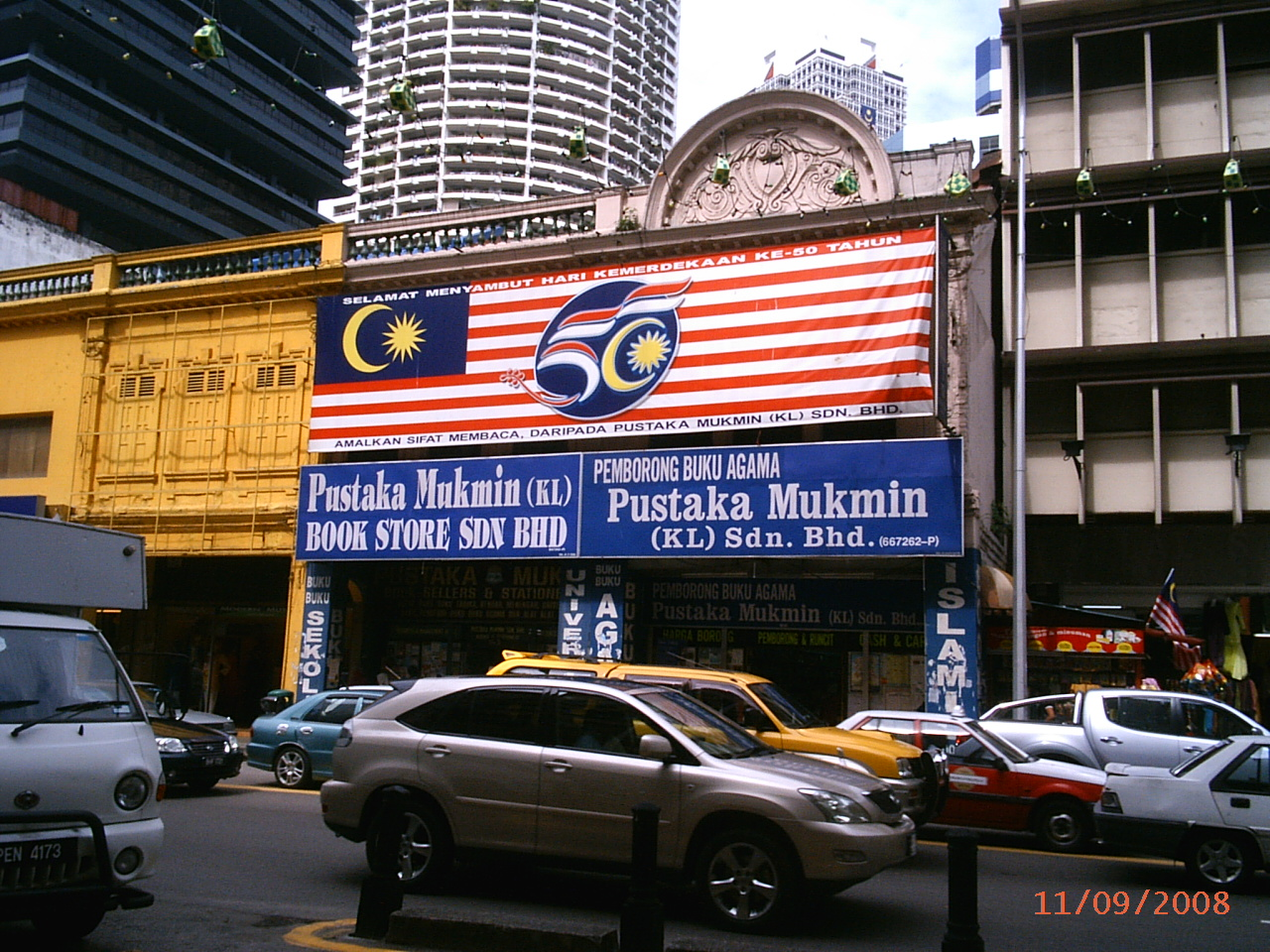
Pustaka Mukmin, a bookstore located in Kuala Lumpur

== Highlights ==
=== Central Market ===
Central Market is a shopping area dedicated to local arts and crafts. It sells a multitude of colourful batiks, the traditional dressing of ethnic Malay Malaysians and other souvenirs. Besides that, Central Market also sells sarees and cheongsams, among other cultural legacies of Malaysia's ethnic minorities. One can also find religious-motivated arts and other trinkets inspired by Buddhism and Hinduism. Traditional Malay craft in the form of local daggers (keris), embellished woodcarvings, traditional kites, and songkets, among other items. There are plans to evolve the place into an art colony.

== Night markets ==
=== Petaling Street ===
Petaling Street (Simplified Chinese: 茨厂街) The name 'Chee Cheong Kai' (Cantonese), which means Starch Factory Street, is reminiscent of when tapioca would be grounded there. This is the Chinatown of Malaysia. There are plenty of counterfeit luxury goods, clothes and shoes sold here. Asian fashion is sold here at cheap prices. Traditional Chinese medicines and China-imported books are aplenty in the Chinese bookstores the surrounding Petaling Street. There is plenty of Chinese food, delicacies and local fruits sold here. It is open into the early hours of the morning.

=== Lorong Tuanku Abdul Rahman ===
It is only opened once a week on Saturdays from 5 – 10 pm—an exciting place to trawl for casual attire, local products, and local delicacies. The fashion featured here is more conservative as the products are targeted at the local Muslim Malay population. Nonetheless, this is the ideal place to buy silks and other quality materials. Many Malay fashion houses are located here. Prices here are cheap if one knows how to bargain. Colourful baju kurung and baju kebaya- the traditional clothing of ethnic Malays- can be found here. Headscarves are also sold here. Luxury fakes, T-shirts, jeans, crafts made of ceramics and pewter are ubiquitous at designated sections of this night market. There are a couple of shopping complexes located nearby.

=== Brickfields ===
This is an Indian themed area of Malaysia. Traditionally the focal point of the Indian colony of Kuala Lumpur, there is lots to buy.

== Bukit Bintang ==
Bukit Bintang is the main designated retail artery of Kuala Lumpur. It has the highest concentration of malls in Kuala Lumpur. Besides modern upmarket retailers, this area also features night markets retailing arts and crafts, counterfeit goods among other souvenirs.

== List of notable shopping malls ==
=== City Centre ===
- Pavilion Kuala Lumpur
- Suria KLCC
- Starhill Gallery
- Fahrenheit 88
- LaLaport Bukit Bintang City Centre
- Lot 10
- Low Yat Plaza
- SOGO KL
- Avenue K
- Intermark Mall
- Berjaya Times Square
- Sungei Wang Plaza
- Sunway Putra Mall
- Great Eastern Mall
- The LINC KL
- The Weld
- The Exchange TRX
- Quill City Mall
- Shoppes At Four Season Place
- 118 Mall (opening soon)

=== Greater Kuala Lumpur ===
==== Mid Valley City ====
The Garden (upper) and Mid Valley Megamall (middle) are located in Greater KL, along the fringes of the city proper. They are both connected by sky bridges, each catering to different segments of shoppers. The Gardens is an upscale mall hosting designer labels the likes of Louis Vuitton, Marks and Spencer, Nine West, ALDO, Geox, ECCO, Lancel, Burberry, DKNY, GAP, ESPRIT, Armani Exchange, Hush Puppies and Hugo Boss. It is anchored by Singapore-based Robinsons and Japanese retailer Isetan, while Mid Valley Megamall caters mainly to the middle-class segment with high-street labels coexisting side-by-side with local retailers. The malls are well-patronised by locals. There are flea markets on weekends in Mid Valley Megamall, where arts and crafts, food, trinkets and souvenirs are sold.

==== Sunway Pyramid ====
Sunway Pyramid (middle) is a huge Egyptian-themed retail mall nestled in a mixed integrated resort that features a wet/dry Wild West-inspired theme park. The retail podium can be reached through the Federal Highway and is located in Bandar Sunway. The mall has distinct Egyptian aesthetics, including pyramids, sphinx, its walls in-scripted with hieroglyphics. The clothes sold here are mostly marketed towards the young and trendy. The mall is zoned into various themed sections, including Asian Avenue and Marrakesh. The brands sold here are a mix of high street brands like Dorothy Perkins, Marks and Spencer, GUESS, Springfield, Timberland, ZARA, PUMA, Lacoste, MANGO and Coach, with lesser-known local and regional brands. Malaysia's first ice-skating rink is located here.

==== Bangsar Village ====
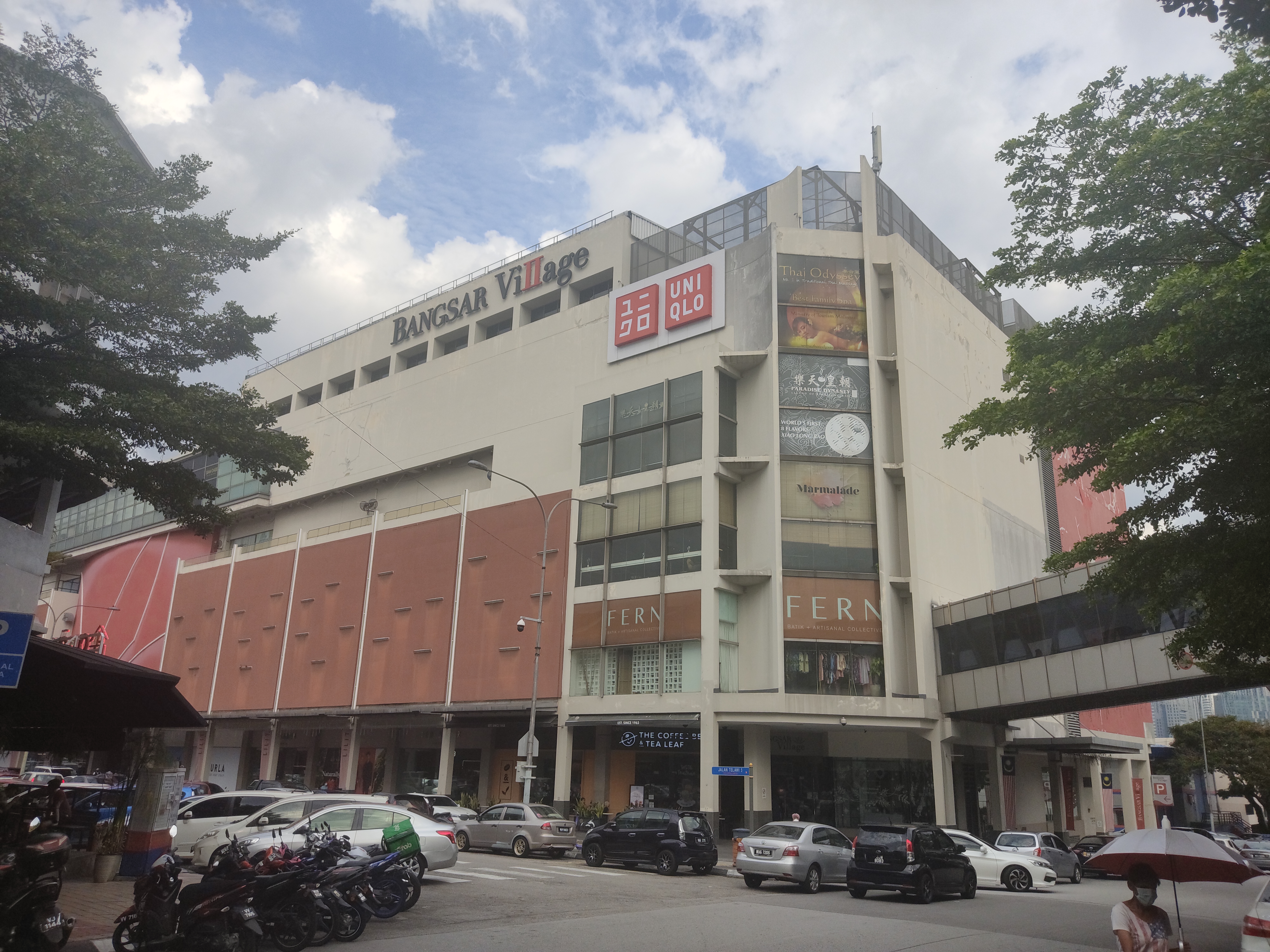
Bangsar Village

Bangsar Village (middle-upper) is located in Bangsar, and is positioned as a small upmarket neighbourhood mall catering to the large expatriate population of Kuala Lumpur. Prices here are a notch higher by local standards.

==== Empire Shopping Gallery Subang (NU Empire) ====
Empire Gallery Subang (middle-upper) is an upmarket neighbourhood mall located in the outskirts of KL, in Subang Jaya. It can be reached by the Federal Highway from Kuala Lumpur. It is small in size and features several international brands alongside exclusive local batik and clothing. It is anchored by a relatively small Tangs departmental store.

==== 1 Utama ====
1 Utama is a (middle-upper) mall borders Kuala Lumpur in Petaling Jaya. It is defined as a large-scale neighbourhood mall largely occupied with locally grown and regional retail startups and establishments. This behemoth however also features American staples the likes of DKNY, Lacoste, florsheim, Massimo Dutti, Forever 21, Coach, Brooks Brothers, GAP, Uniqlo, Cotton On, Polo Ralph Lauren and Tommy Hilfiger.

== See also ==
- List of shopping malls in Malaysia
- Lists of shopping malls
- Shopping mall
