= Stephen Pimbley =

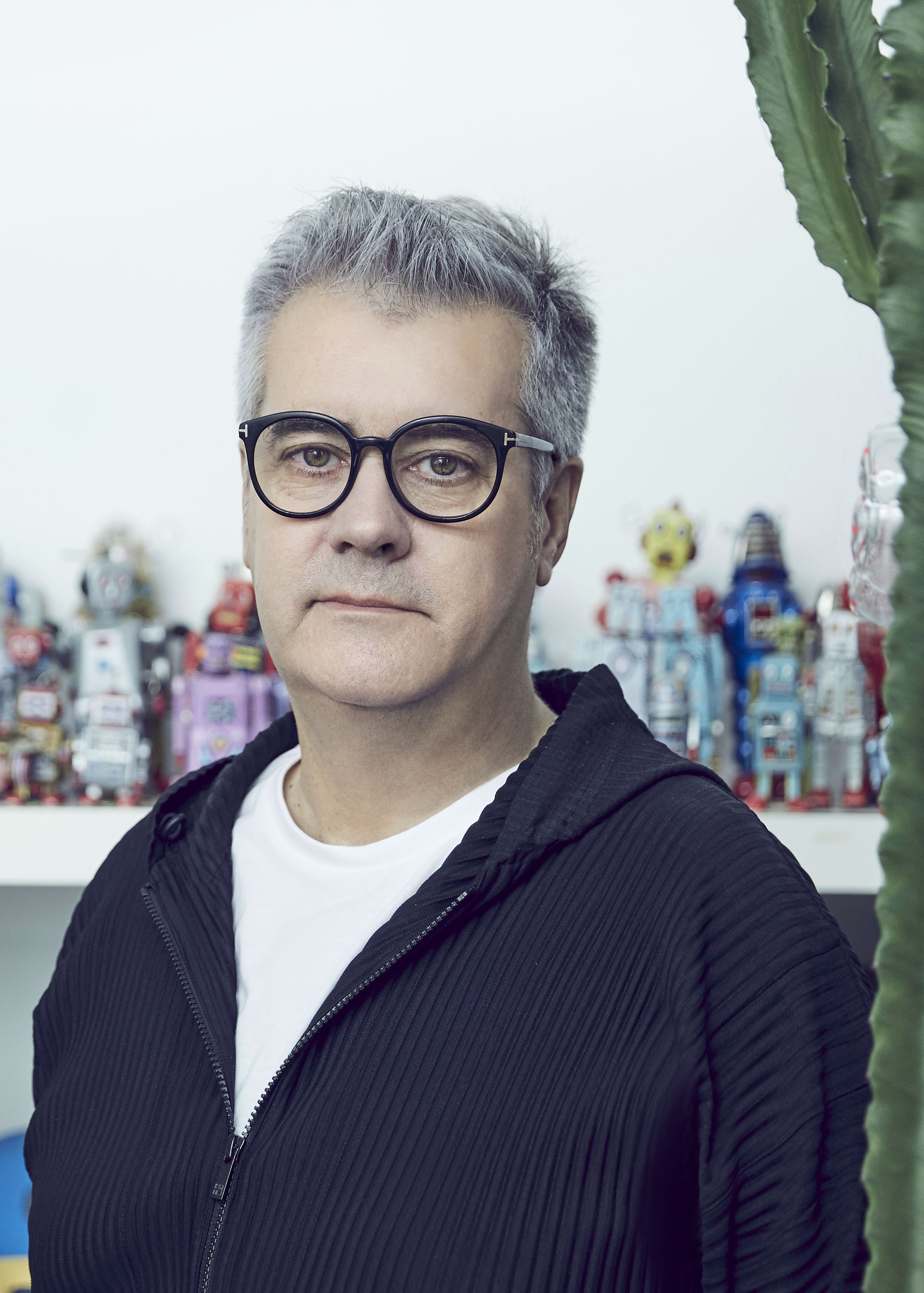
Stephen Pimbley in 2018

Stephen Pimbley is a British architect based in Singapore and one of the founding directors of Spark, an architecture firm.

== Career ==
Pimbley began his undergraduate professional career at YRM in London, working on the North Terminal of Gatwick Airport. Upon graduating from the Royal College of Art London in 1984, he worked at Richard Rogers and Partners, designing the project installations for the Rogers room of the Rogers Foster Stirling exhibition at the Royal Academy of Arts in 1985.

In 1990, Pimbley joined Alsop and Lyall as project architect for the Hôtel du Département des Bouches-du-Rhône in Marseille, France. He was named director in 1994 and partner in 2000. Following his time in Marseille, he worked in Hamburg, Berlin and Rotterdam. In 2000, Pimbley set up the practice's Asia studios and designed the redevelopment of Clarke Quay in Singapore.

=== Spark ===
Pimbley co-founded Spark with Lim Wenhui, in 2008. He led the design research at Spark focusing on social and environmental sustainability issues like recycling ocean plastics, floating hawker centres and aged care living. He presented the project "Homefarm" at the "Future of Healthcare" talk at ExpoMilan, 2015, FutureMe conference in Singapore, 2016, "Housing Futures" Conference in Sydney, 2016 and at the Aging Well Conference in Bangkok, 2017. The Project Homefarm won the Award for Future Experimental category at the World Architecture Festival in 2015. Spark's "Beach hut" a Project focused on recycling ocean plastic won the same category award at World Architecture Festival in 2016.

Some of Pimbley's projects include Capitaland's Raffles City Beijing and Raffles city Ningbo, Starhill Gallery, Shekou Gateway One, Arte S and Guangzhou shipyard master plan.

== Personal life ==
Pimbley married Lim Wenhui, his fellow founder director of Spark.
