= Low Yat =

Low Yat may refer to:

- Low Yat, father of Malaysian property developer Low Yow Chuan
- Plaza Low Yat, a shopping centre in Kuala Lumpur, Malaysia
