= Pimbley =

Pimbley is a surname. Notable people with the surname include:

- Doug Pimbley (1917–1988), English footballer
- Stephen Pimbley, British architect
