= Y. T. Lee =

Y. T. Lee may refer to:

- Yuan T. Lee, Taiwanese chemist
- Lee Yoon Thim, Malaysian architect and politician
