= Niceaunties =

Singaporean AI and digital artist

- Born: 1981 (age 44–45); Singapore
- Known for: Digital art, AI art, installation
- Website: Instagram

Niceaunties is the pseudonym of a Singapore-based artist and designer whose work incorporates generative artificial intelligence, video, and digital installation. Her practice centers around the figure of the "auntie", a common term for older women in Southeast Asian contexts, and explores themes such as aging, care, domesticity, and gender roles.

Her work has been featured in exhibitions and media platforms including TED, Christie's Art + Tech, Expanded.Art, and publications such as The Guardian, The Straits Times.

== Early life and career ==
Niceaunties was born in 1981 in Singapore. She attributes her inspiration for "auntie culture" to the matriarchal environment and older women of her household, including her grandmother, while growing up. She is also an architectural designer with Spark Architect.

The Niceaunties project began in 2023 after she encountered AI-generated images in her work as an architect. It draws inspiration from women in the artist's family and broader Southeast Asian cultural dynamics. Her work often features AI-generated visuals created with tools such as DALL-E, Krea, RunwayML, and SORA. Her imagery and narratives center on the fictional "Auntieverse", which features older women in imagined settings involving community, ecology, and labor.

Her notable works include 'Auntlantis', a five-part video series imagining older women engaged in ocean clean-up and collective ritual, and 'Goddess,' a video created with Sora, featuring a character who gradually forgets her divine identity through years of domestic labor.

== Exhibitions ==
- 2024 – Expanded.Art, Berlin – Auntiedote solo exhibition
- 2024 – TED (conference), Vancouver – Speaker and screening
- 2024 – Victoria and Albert Museum, London – Digital Art Weekend
- 2024 – Louisiana Museum of Modern Art, Denmark – Ocean exhibition
- 2025 – Christie's Augmented Intelligence Auction, New York

== Reception ==
In 2024, Niceaunties gave a TED Talk titled The Weird and Wonderful Art of Niceaunties. Journalist Rebecca Ratcliffe, writing for The Guardian, described her work as combining AI with "the surreal and the political," noting her focus on older women as central characters. Her work has also received criticism for being reliant on generative AI, which many feel exploits and steals from traditional artists.
