= Spark Architects =

International architecture studio

Spark (stylised as SPARK) is a design studio based in Singapore and Shanghai.

== History ==
In 2003, CapitaLand hired British architectural firm Alsop Architects to revamp Clarke Quay. Stephen Pimbley set up Alsop Architects' Asia studios to handle the Clarke Quay redevelopment. The redevelopment included an overhaul of shophouse facades, streetscapes, and riverfront dining areas.

In 2006, Pimbley and Wenhui Lim co-founded Spark from Alsop Architects' Asia studios.

In 2014, Spark designed floating hawker centres in Singapore.

In 2015, Spark won the Experimental – Future Projects category at the World Architecture Festival with its Homefarm, a conceptual proposal for the next generation of urban retirement housing.

In 2016, Spark won the Experimental – Future Projects category at the World Architecture Festival with its Spark Beach Hut, a pine cone-shaped structure, which was made of plastic waste thrown into the ocean.

== Notable projects ==
- GR.iD, shopping mall in Singapore.
- Starhill Gallery, shopping mall in Kuala Lumpur, Malaysia

== Notable staff ==
- Niceaunties
