= Lee Yoon Thim =

Malaysian politician

Chinese name
- Traditional Chinese: 李潤添
- Hanyu Pinyin: Lǐ Rùntiān
- Jyutping: Lei5 Jeon6 Tim1

Dato' Y. T. Lee, also known as Lee Yoon Thim (Chinese: 李潤添; pinyin: Lǐ Rùntiān; Jyutping: Lei5 Jeon6 Tim1; 1905–1977), was a Malaysian Chinese architect active in Kuala Lumpur during the 1950s and 1960s. He contributed to development efforts following Malaysian independence in 1963.

Lee moved in elite social and political circles and held several positions in the national government and within the Chinese community. He was a close associate of Prime Minister Tuanku Abdul Rahman and other political figures. He designed several landmark buildings in Kuala Lumpur, including the Chin Woo Stadium, the UMNO Building, Dewan Bahasa dan Pustaka, the Federal Hotel, Kampung Baru Mosque, Ar-Rahman Mosque, and Masjid Al-Ubudiyah.

In addition to his well-known mosques in Kuala Lumpur, he also worked on Middle Eastern and Islamic architecture projects, including Masjid Al-Ubudiyah in Kerling—a modest mosque in Hulu Selangor that opened in 1960. When the mosque was built, the area had no electricity supply, and it served as a teaching centre for the local community. His lesser-known works include the Too House, an addition to the Methodist Boys' School, as well as various healthcare and commercial projects.

Lee received several honours in the early 1960s. In 1960, he was awarded the Pingat Jasa Kebaktian (P.J.K.). In 1961, he was appointed Justice of the Peace, and in 1962 he was awarded the Johan Mangku Negara (J.M.N.). In 1964, he received the title of Dato', an honorific comparable to the English title Sir.

== Personal life ==
In his early years, Lee travelled to England, Germany, and Italy for his studies, earning a master's degree in engineering. He later returned to Malaysia and founded Y. T. Lee & Co. His ancestors were from Nanhai County, Foshan, in Canton Province.

Lee married and had at least three children, including two daughters. His children pursued professional careers: one became a doctor, one an architect, and one a bank executive. His son, Lee Hong Fatt, worked as a bank executive, while one of his daughters, Lee Chee Peng, earned an arts degree from the University of Sydney.

== Career as an administrator and politician ==
=== Administrator ===
Lee was elected president of the Associated Chinese Chamber and the Selangor Chinese Assembly Hall on 21 March 1958.

=== Politician ===
Lee was a member of the Malaysian Chinese Association. He contributed to the Chinese community in Malaysia and served as an advocate on various community matters. He was also active in promoting Chinese education in the country and supported the development of an independent Chinese high school.

== Significant buildings ==
- Too House – The Too House, built in 1952, is an Art Deco-style residence located within the Golden Triangle business and commercial district.
- Chin Woo Stadium – The sports complex is located at Jalan Hang Jebat, 50150 Kuala Lumpur. It belongs to an international martial arts organisation founded in Shanghai in the 1910s by Huo Yuan Jia (Master Fok Yuen-Kap), and first introduced to Malaya in the 1920s. The project's foundation stone was laid by Sultan Hisamuddin Alam Shah of Selangor on 31 August 1951, and it was opened by Sir McDonald, the High Commissioner of Great Britain, on 11 December 1953, in the presence of local leaders. Lee was a member of the committee for the opening ceremony.
- Methodist Boys School – The Methodist Boys School extension was opened on 16 November 1955. Sultan Hisamuddin Alam Shah received the key from architect Y. T. Lee to inaugurate the new RM110,000 wing in Sentul, Kuala Lumpur. The school was founded by Rev. Preston L. Peach in 1936, with an initial cohort of seven students.
- UMNO building – The UMNO building, a rectangular four-storey structure, was completed in 1955 to serve as the headquarters of the United Malays National Organisation. It is located on Jalan Tuanku Abdul Rahman.
- Federal Hotel – Built in 1957 for the celebration of Merdeka (Malaya's Independence Day), the Federal Hotel was founded by Tan Sri Low Yat. A 1971 article described Lee as an expert in hospitality design and credited him with designing four hotels, two of them in Bukit Bintang. Ar Azaiddy Abdullah notes that Lee worked with municipal architect Eric Taylor on the Merlin Hotel between 1957 and 1959. The building was later renamed the Concorde Hotel, and its original interiors—including the once-famous Harlequin Bar and Grill—have been significantly altered.
- Dewan Bahasa dan Pustaka – The construction of Dewan Bahasa dan Pustaka was completed on 31 January 1962. Its most distinctive feature is a 65-by-25-foot glazed mosaic mural designed by Ismail Mustam. The complex layout on its prominent site has been compared to that of the United Nations headquarters, with a figural auditorium facing the traffic circle and a larger administrative block situated behind it.
- Masjid Jamek Kampung Baru – The mosque was officially opened on 12 July 1957 and can accommodate up to 7,000 worshippers during Friday prayers. It is located in Kampung Baru, near the Petronas Towers. Its defining feature is a large column-free prayer hall. One of its main entrances is aligned at a right angle to the qibla wall. The building features restrained decoration, with windows in a modified Islamic arch form and several onion domes. Thin pilasters and geometric detailing reflect early Islamic modernism. Masjid Jamek Kampung Baru underwent renovations in 2015.
- Masjid Ar-Rahman – Masjid Ar-Rahman was officially opened on 23 August 1963 by Tuanku Syed Putra Al-Haj Ibni Almarhum Syed Hassan Jamalullail. The project cost a total of $350,000 and was built to serve the nearby University of Malaya. The mosque was initially designed in a modern style, though later renovations incorporated more traditional elements. It is located on Jalan Tuanku Abdul Rahman.
- Masjid Al-Ubudiyah – This mosque, located in Kerling, opened in 1964. Electricity was not supplied to the building during its early years. Its design reflects a hybrid of Middle Eastern and Islamic architectural forms with modernist influences. The repetitive patterns on the fencing, the rounded arch windows, and the pointed arches between columns show similarities to the design and materials used in Masjid Jamek Kampung Baru. A distinctive feature of the mosque is the inclusion of a window in the mihrab.
- Mosque in Kerling – Mosque in Kuala Kubu Bharu
- Masjid India Mosque – Masjid India is an Indian Muslim mosque located in Little India, Kuala Lumpur. It was officiated by the Sultan of Selangor in 1966, although the site's history dates back to 1863. The mosque was funded through private donations from the Indian Muslim community. Lee was commissioned to prepare working drawings for a "mosque and madrasa" on Malay Street in 1963 and 1964. The project advanced at least to the tender notice stage, with the client being the South Indian Muslim Committee on Jalan Mountbatten. The extent of Lee's involvement in the design of the existing Masjid India Mosque remains unclear, as it has undergone multiple renovations since the 1960s. However, the exterior façade shares formal similarities with that of Masjid Jamek Kampung Baru, suggesting Lee's influence.

== Other buildings ==
- Tanjong Karang Hospital – Tanjong Karang Hospital is a rural government hospital located in Tanjong Karang, Selangor. It was built at a cost of RM1.73 million and began operating in 1966 as part of the second phase of rural development expenditure for medical and health services. From 1966 to 1970, the hospital had a total of 57 beds.
- Y.W.C.A. Building – The hostel and assembly hall for the Young Women's Christian Association (Y.W.C.A.) was proposed by Lee Yoon Thim in 1952. It is located at Jalan Hang Jebat, Kuala Lumpur. The building was designed to provide accommodation for young girls and women from across Malaysia. Its assembly hall is used for programmes and events for underserved communities.
- Masjid Negeri – The project for Masjid Negeri was proposed by Y. T. Lee & Co. in 1967. The mosque is located in Kuching, Sarawak. Construction began in 1987 and was completed in 1990. The complex covers an area of approximately 100 acres and is considered one of the most significant landmarks in the state. It can accommodate up to 10,000 worshippers.
- Community Hall, Raub, Pahang – This project was proposed in 1961 by Y. T. Lee & Co. The building is located at Jalan Cheroh, Raub, Pahang.
- Office Building – This six-storey office building was proposed by Y. T. Lee in 1954. It is located at Lots 186–189, Jalan Ampang, Kuala Lumpur.
- Bank and Office Building – The five-storey bank and office building is located at Lots 7–8, Section 48, Jalan Ipoh, Kuala Lumpur. It was proposed by Y. T. Lee in 1965.

== Death ==
Dato' Y. T. Lee died on 7 February 1977 at the age of 72 and was buried in a Chinese cemetery.
