= Arte S =

Condominium in George Town, Penang, Malaysia

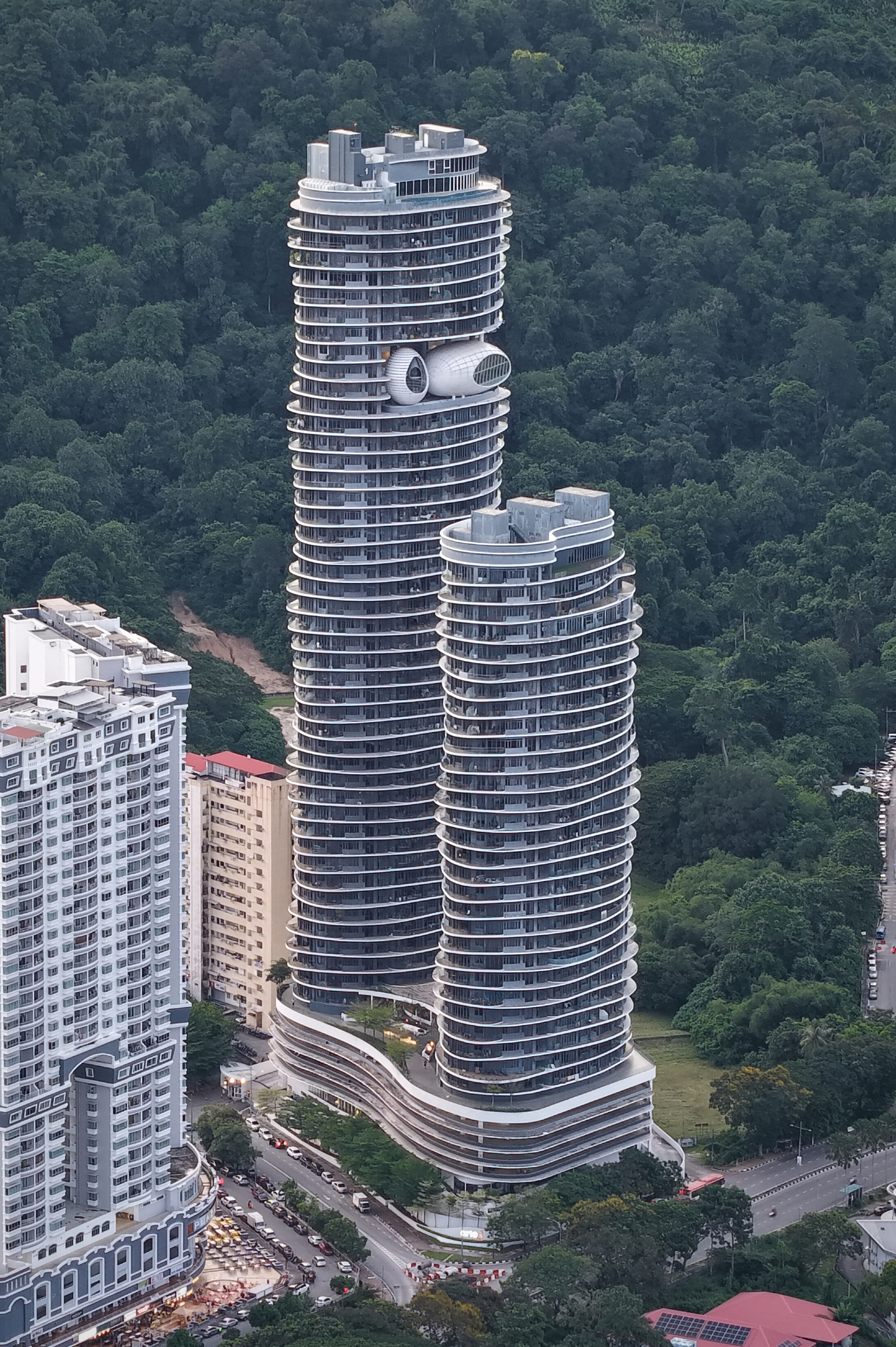

General information
- Type: Condominium
- Architectural style: Neo-futurism
- Location: Jalan Bukit Gambir, 11700 George Town, Penang, Malaysia, George Town, Penang, Malaysia
- Completed: May 2018
- Owner: Arte Corp (formerly Nusmetro)

Height
- Roof: A: 125.1 m (410 ft); B: 186.0 m (610.2 ft)
- Top floor: A: 114.10 m (374.3 ft); B: 172.40 m (565.6 ft)

Technical details
- Floor count: A: 35; B: 51 (3 floors below ground)
- Floor area: 780,384 sq ft (72,500.0 m^{2})

Design and construction
- Architect: SPARK
- Developer: Arte Corp
- Structural engineer: Passage Projects; Perunding YAA; East Design Architect

Arte S is a residential complex within George Town in the Malaysian state of Penang. Located at the neighbourhood of Bukit Gambir, the complex consists of two residential towers, Tower A and Tower B.

== Height ==
Tower A, with 35 stories, has a height of 121.4 m (398 ft). On the other hand, with 51 stories and a height of 186 m (610 ft), Tower B of the complex is the tallest skyscraper within Gelugor, as well as one of the tallest in George Town.

== Usage of units and facilities ==
Both towers contain a total of 480 residential units, with areas ranging from 584 to 5,560 sq ft (54.3 to 516.5 m^{2}). A notable sight are two pod-like structures named "PODs", each 4-stories tall in height. They occupy the sky-garden of the 35th to the 39th floor of Tower B. Meant for recreational and entertainment purposes, it could accommodate up to 60 people at once. The building has a gross-floor-area of 780,384 sq ft (72,500.0 m^{2}), with 3 underground floors.

== Development ==
Development started in 2013 by Nusmetro (later named as Arte Corp), a Malaysian property and development firm. The design of the structure was undertaken by Spark, an architectural firm based in London, Shanghai and Singapore. Construction started in 2015, with a scheduled completion date of October 2017. The structure later topped-out in 2017, before full completion in May 2018.

== Reception of design ==
The building has been notable for its unusual look among locals, with "rotating-fin-geometries", creating unique observation angles on each floor. The design was inspired by the geography of Penang Island, with the towers sitting between the island's undulating hills and the Penang Strait nearby. The design was praised as being innovative among critics, in which Nusmetro won the "Best Apartment of the Year" award in the 13th Kinpan Awards for this project.

== See also ==
- List of tallest buildings in George Town
