= The Starhill =

- Entrance of The Starhill in 2023
- Location: Bukit Bintang, Kuala Lumpur, Malaysia
- Coordinates: 3.1477°N 101.7130°E
- Opened: 30 July 2005
- Developer: YTL Corporation
- Owner: Starhill Global REIT
- Floor area: 250,000 square feet (23,000 m^{2})
- Floors: 7
- Public transit: KG18A Pavilion Kuala Lumpur–Bukit Bintang MRT station MR6 Bukit Bintang Monorail station
- Website: thestarhill.com.my

The Starhill, previously known as Starhill Gallery, is a luxury shopping mall located in the Bukit Bintang shopping district of Kuala Lumpur, Malaysia right opposite of Pavilion Kuala Lumpur. The mall reopened on 30 July 2005 and was previously known as Starhill Center.

In 1999, when business was in decline, it was acquired by YTL Corporation. YTL decided to do away with the anchor tenant-based business model and transform Starhill into a luxury brand retail centre. It underwent extensive renovation led by architect David Rockwell and reopened on 30 July 2005 as Starhill Gallery.

The mall is connected to the JW Marriott Kuala Lumpur by a tunnel. The link bridge also connects to the Ritz-Carlton Kuala Lumpur.

In 2020, Starhill Gallery was renamed once again as The Starhill. Under renovation since October 2019, the mall was reopened in phases from the second quarter of 2020 and will officially be re-launched in 2021. The top levels of the mall will be replaced with additional 162 rooms for JW Marriott.

On 17 December 2022, Eslite Bookstore, a well-known bookstore chain from Taiwan, opened its flagship store as "Eslite Spectrum". Eslite is known for its wide selection of books, comfortable reading environment and diverse cultural activities. The Kuala Lumpur store is approximately 20,000 square feet in size and has sections for books, stationery, music, art and lifestyle. The book selection includes a variety of languages, including Chinese, English and Malay, and there are dedicated sections for children's books and young adult books. The store also features an "Eslite Life Center" that offers coffee, dining, and creative merchandise. In addition, the store regularly hosts lectures, concerts and art exhibitions to provide readers with a rich cultural experience.

== Gallery ==
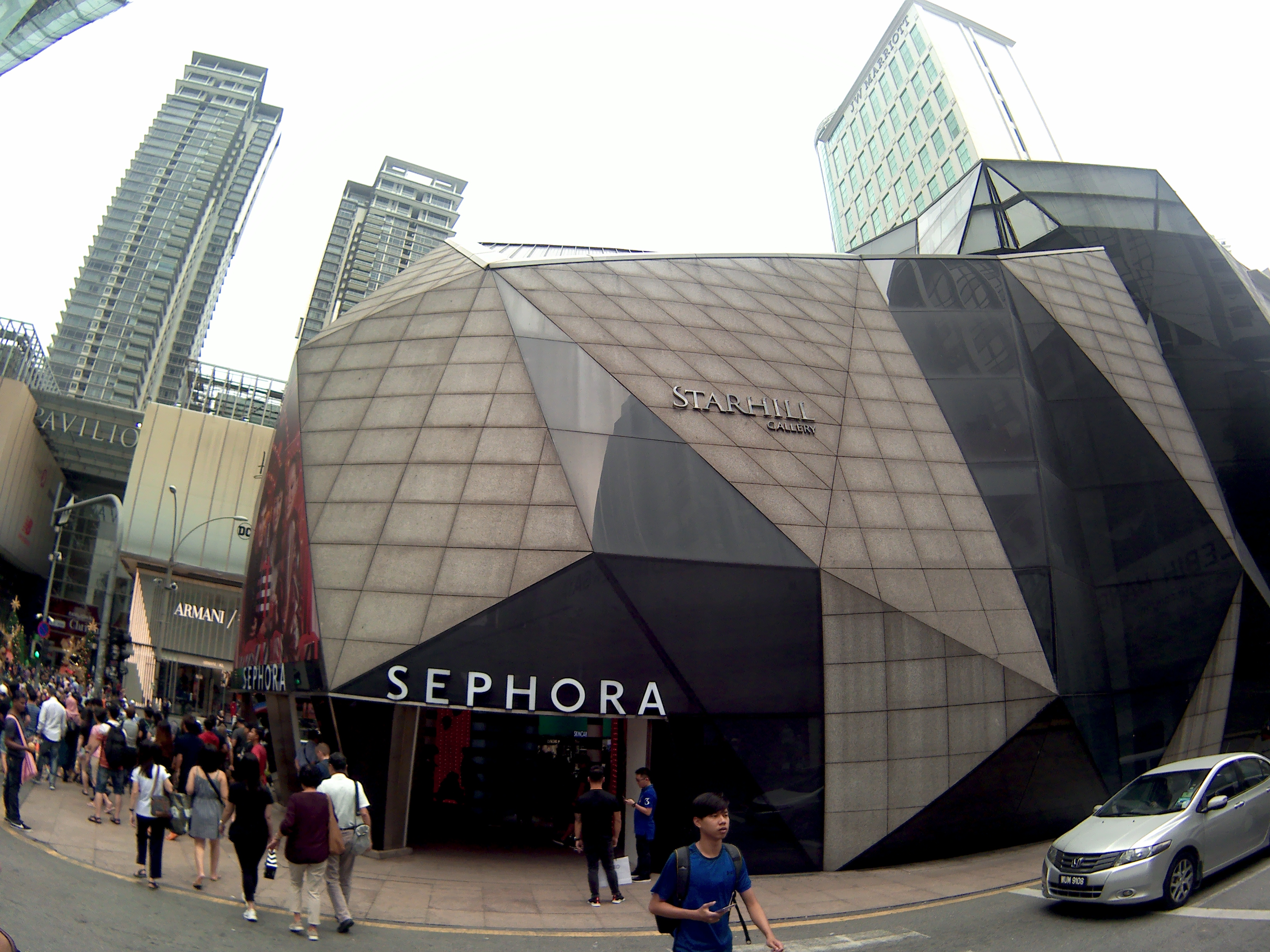
Exterior façade of the mall in 2017 before renovations

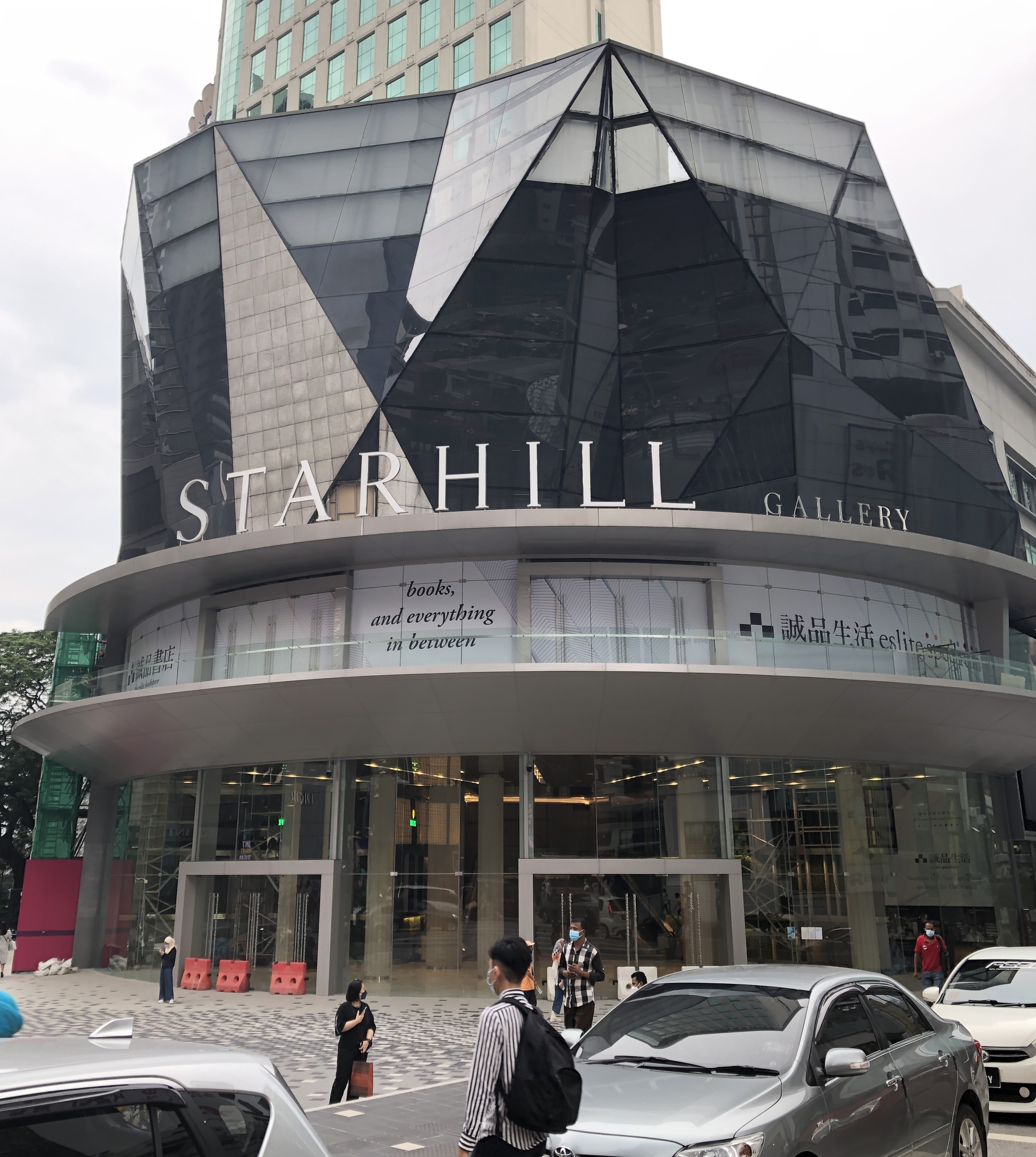
The Starhill in 2021

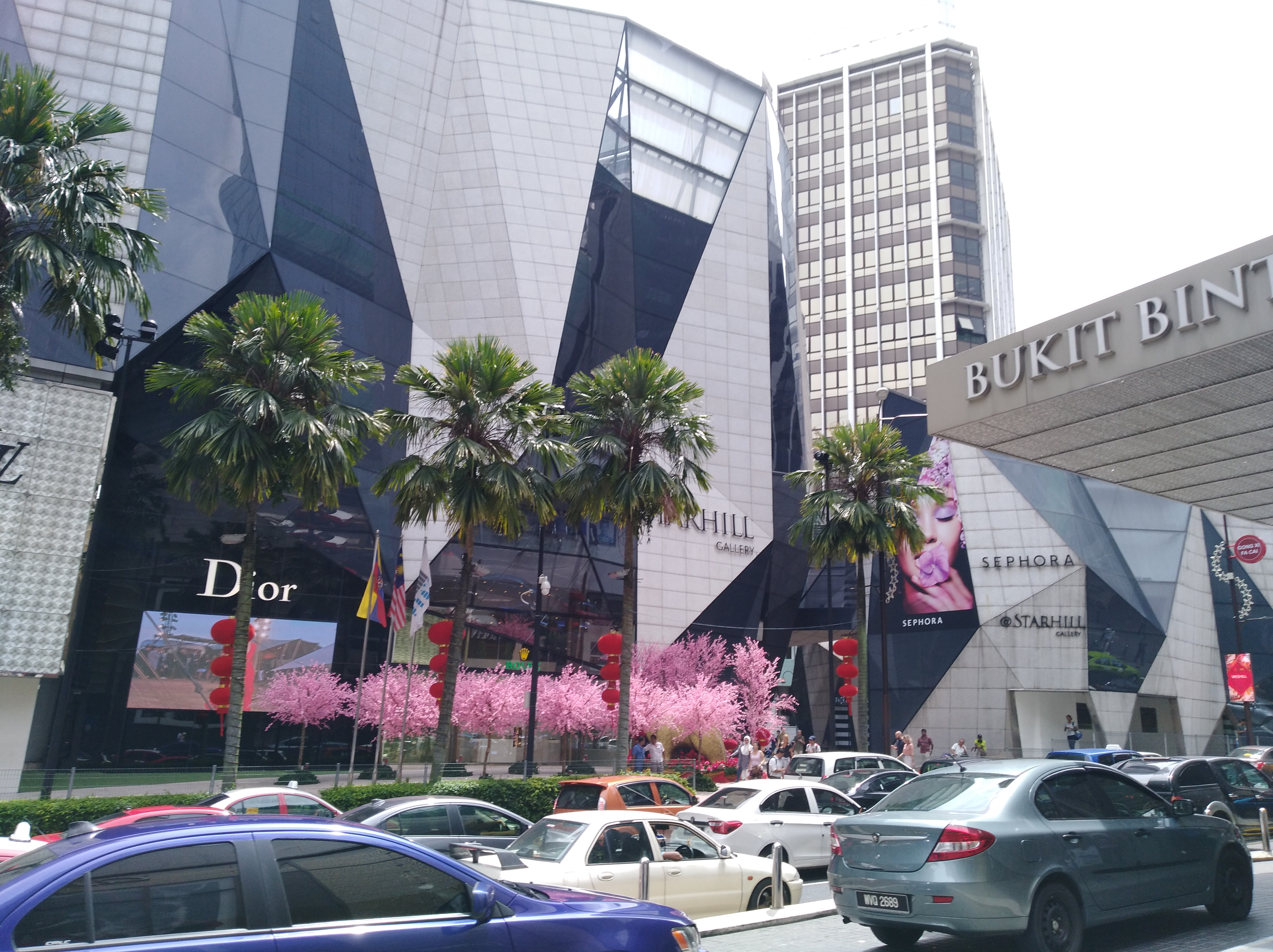
View from Jalan Bukit Bintang in 2018

Entrance of Eslite Bookstore

Interior of Eslite Bookstore

== See also ==
- Shopping in Kuala Lumpur
- List of shopping malls in Malaysia
