= Fahrenheit 88 =

Shopping mall in Bukit Bintang, Kuala Lumpur, Malaysia

- 华氏/飞轮海88
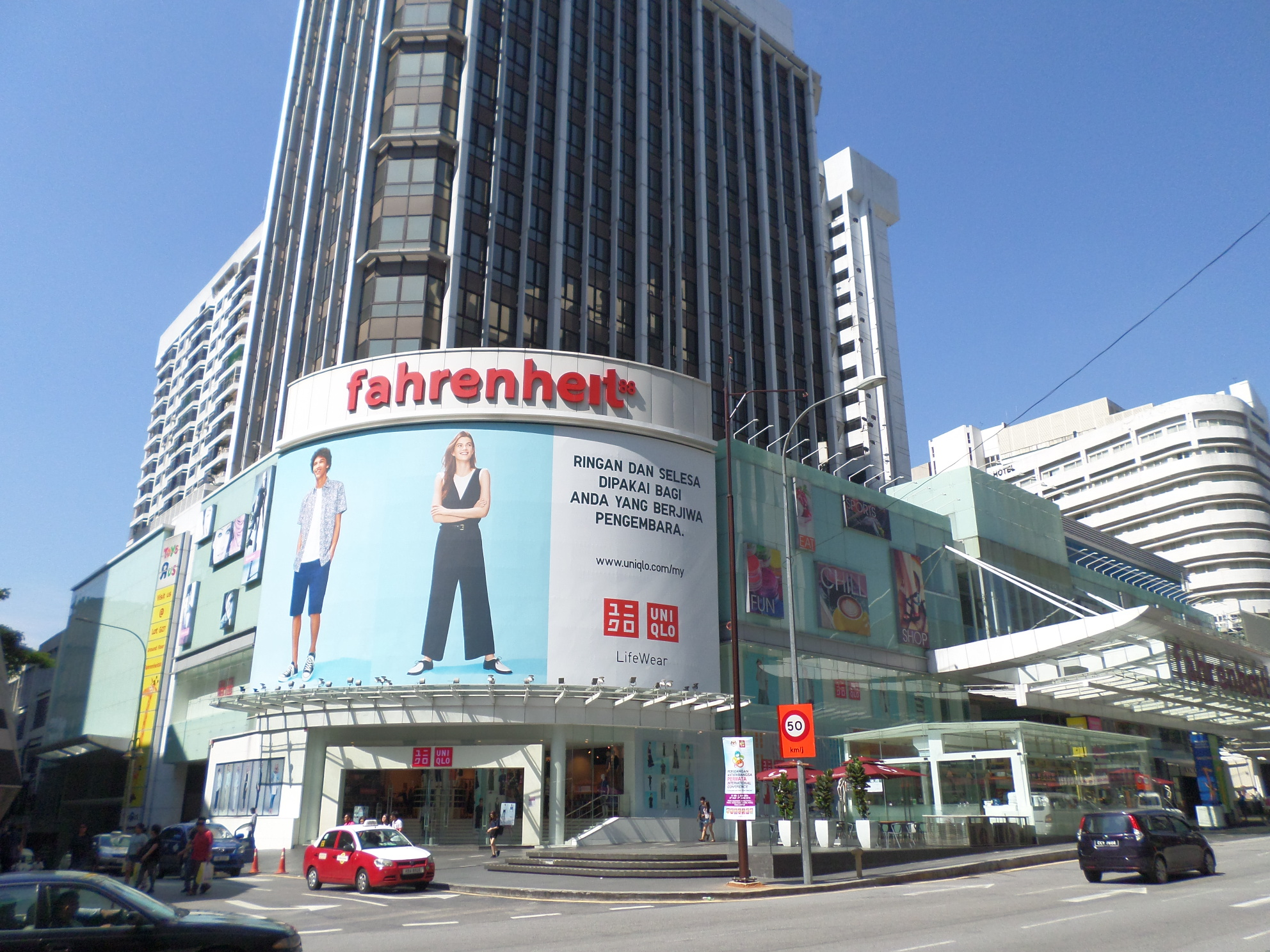
- Location: 179 Jalan Gading, Bukit Bintang, Kuala Lumpur, Malaysia
- Coordinates: 3.1475°N 101.7125°E
- Opened: 8 August 2010; 16 years ago
- Previous names: KL Plaza
- Manager: Kuala Lumpur Pavilion Sdn Bhd
- Owner: Makna Mujur Sdn Bhd, a subsidiary of Pavilion International Development Fund Ltd
- Num. of stores: 280
- Floor area: 300,000 square feet (28,000 m^{2})
- Floors: 5 + 3 lower grounds
- Public transit: KG18A Bukit Bintang MRT station MR6 Bukit Bintang Monorail station
- Website: www.fahrenheit88.com

Fahrenheit 88 (previously known as KL Plaza) is a shopping centre in Bukit Bintang, Kuala Lumpur, Malaysia. The Fahrenheit 88 building reopened in August 2010 after extensive renovation. Management and leasing of the shopping centre are handled by the same company that manages the Pavilion Kuala Lumpur shopping centre.

== History ==
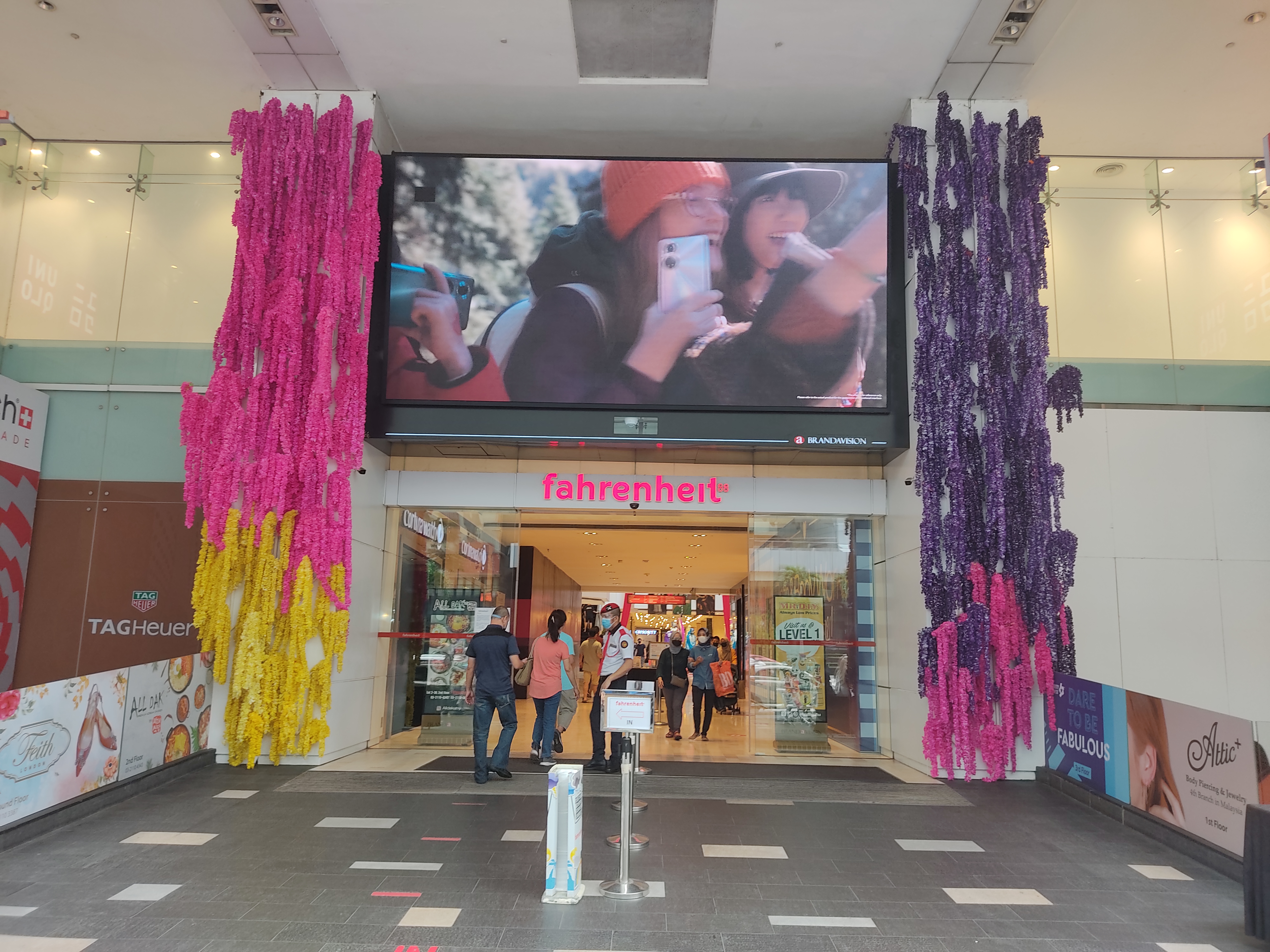
Main entrance

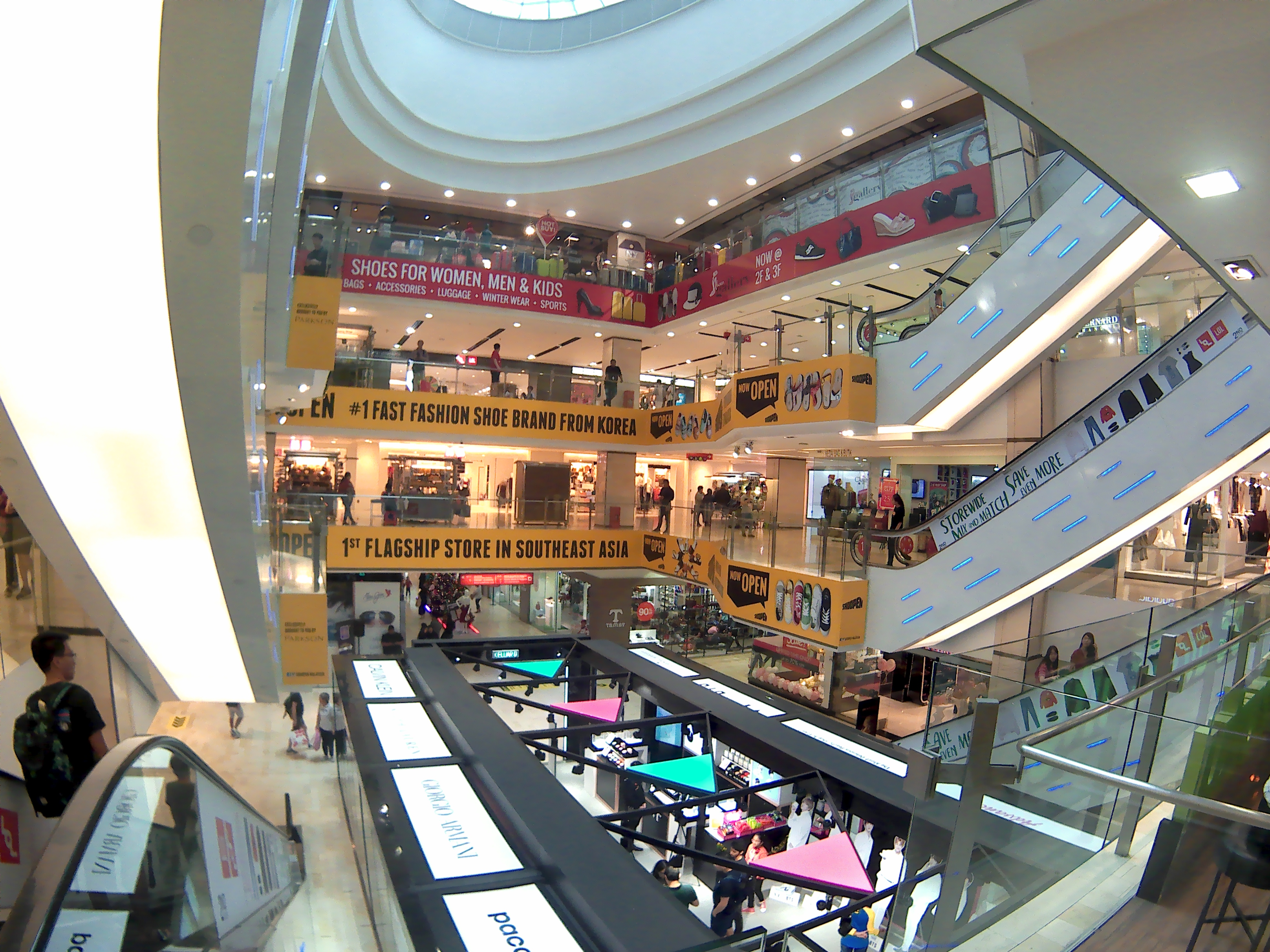
Interior

The Fahrenheit 88 building was previously known as KL Plaza (shopping centre) and owned by Berjaya Leisure Berhad, a company of the Berjaya Group.

One of the Malaysian outlets of French department store chain Printemps was located here. Earlier the outlet wanted to discontinue its operations at KL Plaza in September 1986 due to the lack of long-term viability.

Mun Loong had its flagship outlet at KL Plaza, opened in 1987. Occupying a space of 90,000 square feet (8,400 m^{2}), the outlet closed in mid-1996 due to Mun Loong being "unfavourable" with the new terms of KL Plaza's lease renewal.

In 2007, Berjaya Group disposed of the KL Plaza building for a total consideration of RM470 million to the Pavilion Group. The sale consisted of the 5-storey shopping podium for RM425 million and 59 units of flats located on top of the shopping centre for RM45 million.

In early 2010, a publicity exercise was embarked by the Pavilion team, with major local press reporting on the rebranding of the building as Fahrenheit 88, a name reflecting the average temperature in Malaysia (31.1 C). Building renovation works, already underway at that time and reportedly to cost RM100 million, were intended to entirely change the interior and exterior of the old and outdated building, with entrances repositioned and glass facades added, allowing ample natural light to illuminate the interior.

== See also ==
- List of shopping malls in Malaysia
