= Bukit Bintang =

Shopping district in Kuala Lumpur, Malaysia

Coordinates: 3.14668°N 101.71119°E

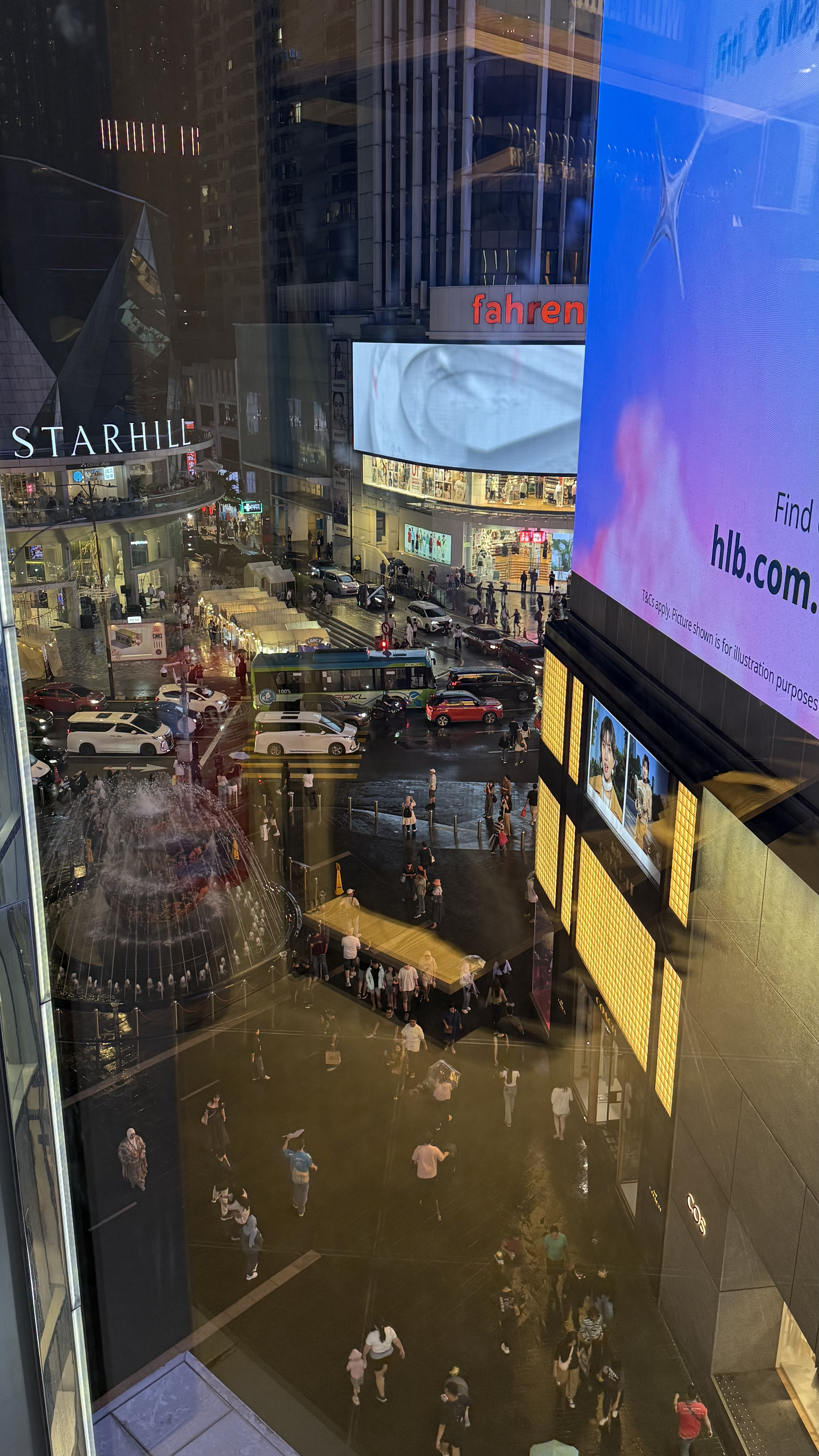
Bukit Bintang taken from Pavillion Complex on 9 May 2026

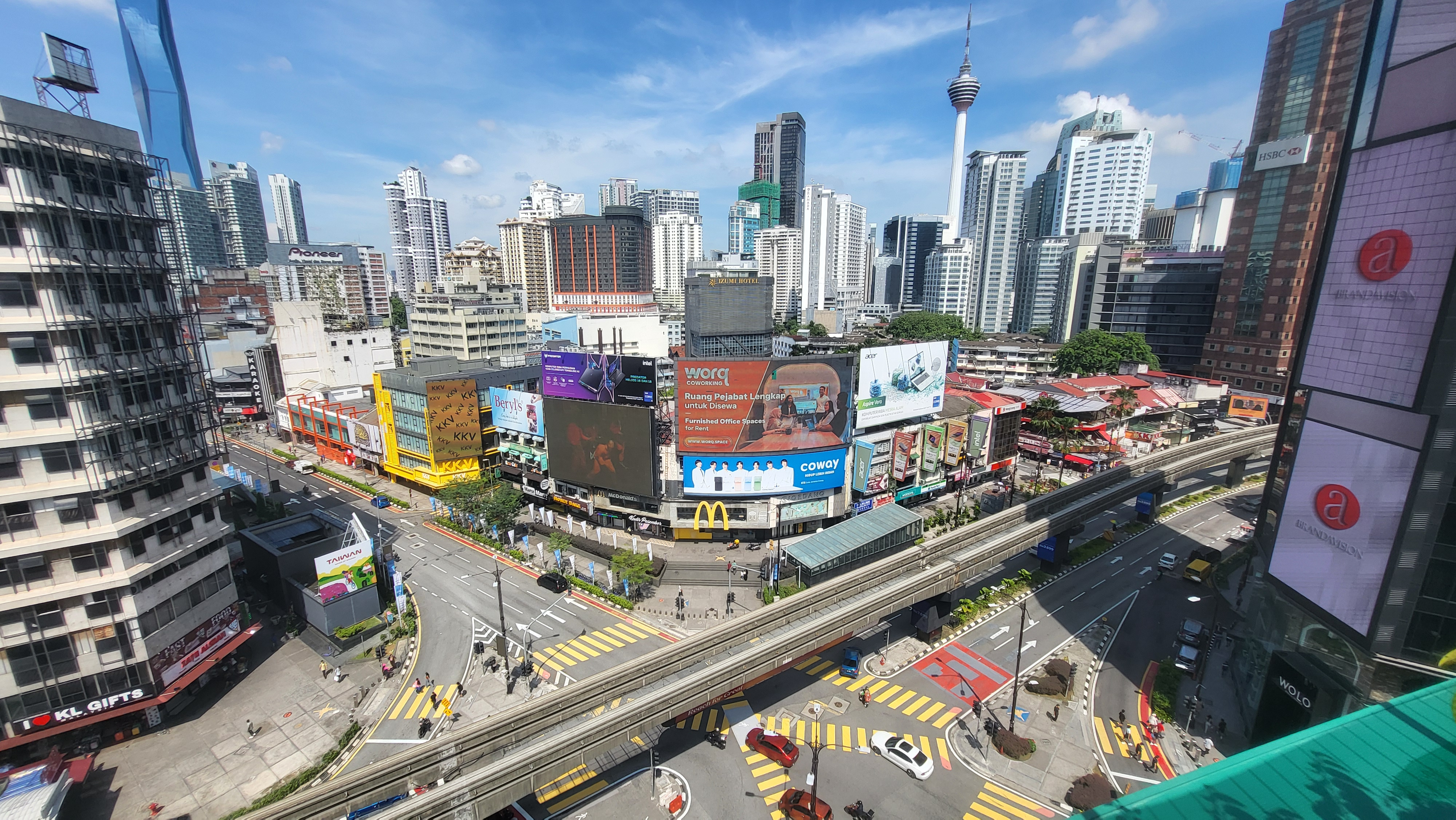
Bukit Bintang in 2024

Bukit Bintang (Malay: [ˈbu.ket̚ ˈbin.taŋ]; stylised as Bintang Walk, is the shopping and entertainment district of Kuala Lumpur, Malaysia. It encompasses Jalan Bukit Bintang (Bukit Bintang Road in English) and its immediate surrounding areas. The area has long been Kuala Lumpur's most prominent retail belt that is home to many landmark shopping centres, al-fresco cafés, bars, night markets, food street, mamak stalls as well as hawker-type eateries. This area is popular among tourists and locals, especially among the youths.

Since June 2021, the local municipal and authority, Kuala Lumpur City Hall (DBKL), has created a scramble crossing at the junction of Bukit Bintang, located in front of the McDonald's Bukit Bintang outlet, just below the KL Monorail Line. This was done to increase the walkability in the area.

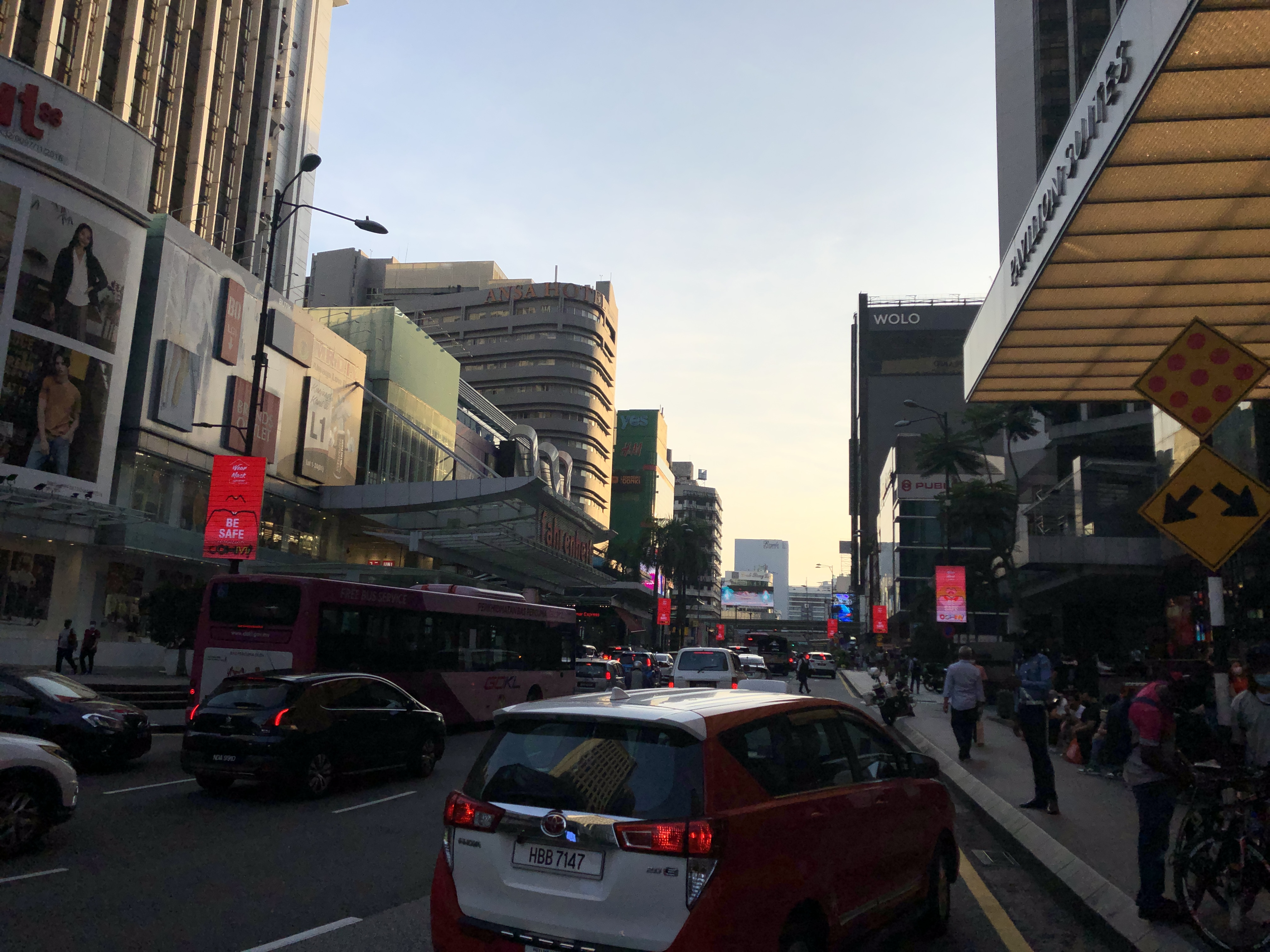
Jalan Bukit Bintang from Pavilion KL in 2021

== Location ==
Located within Kuala Lumpur's Golden Triangle, the Bukit Bintang district begins with Jalan Bukit Bintang, starting at Jalan Raja Chulan and ending at Jalan Pudu. The two other roads that border the Bukit Bintang district are Jalan Sultan Ismail , intersecting it and Jalan Imbi at the south. Jalan Walter Grenier, Jalan Bulan, Changkat Bukit Bintang and Jalan Alor are considered part of the entertainment district.

Bukit Bintang borders Pudu and Cheras to the south, Petaling Street (Chinatown) to the west, Bukit Nanas to the north, Kuala Lumpur City Centre (KLCC) to the northeast as well as Tun Razak Exchange and Maluri district to the east.

== History ==
The name Jalan Bukit Bintang was taken in conjunction with a hill about 50m high that was located near Kampung Dollah which was a Malay village that now no longer exists and is now replaced with Jalan Changkat Thambi Dollah and Jalan Barat. Jalan Bukit Bintang is a 3.4 km long road starting from the intersection of Jalan Raja Chulan and ending at Jalan Pudu. In the past, Bukit Bintang was a residential area.

In 1945, Jalan Bukit Bintang was the only street that had entertainment, shops and hawker food. Back then, the street featured a famous cabaret, cultural shows, Malay joget, Chinese opera shows, wayang, ballroom dances like rhumba, foxtrot and tango, and amusement fun fair elements like a merry-go-round and ferris wheel. Low Yow Chuan built the Capitol Hotel in 1948, which was later sold and is now called the Malaysia Hotel. In 1947, Hong Kong media mogul Shaw built the famous and popular Bukit Bintang Amusement Park. This entertainment centre was where Sungai Wang Plaza is located today.

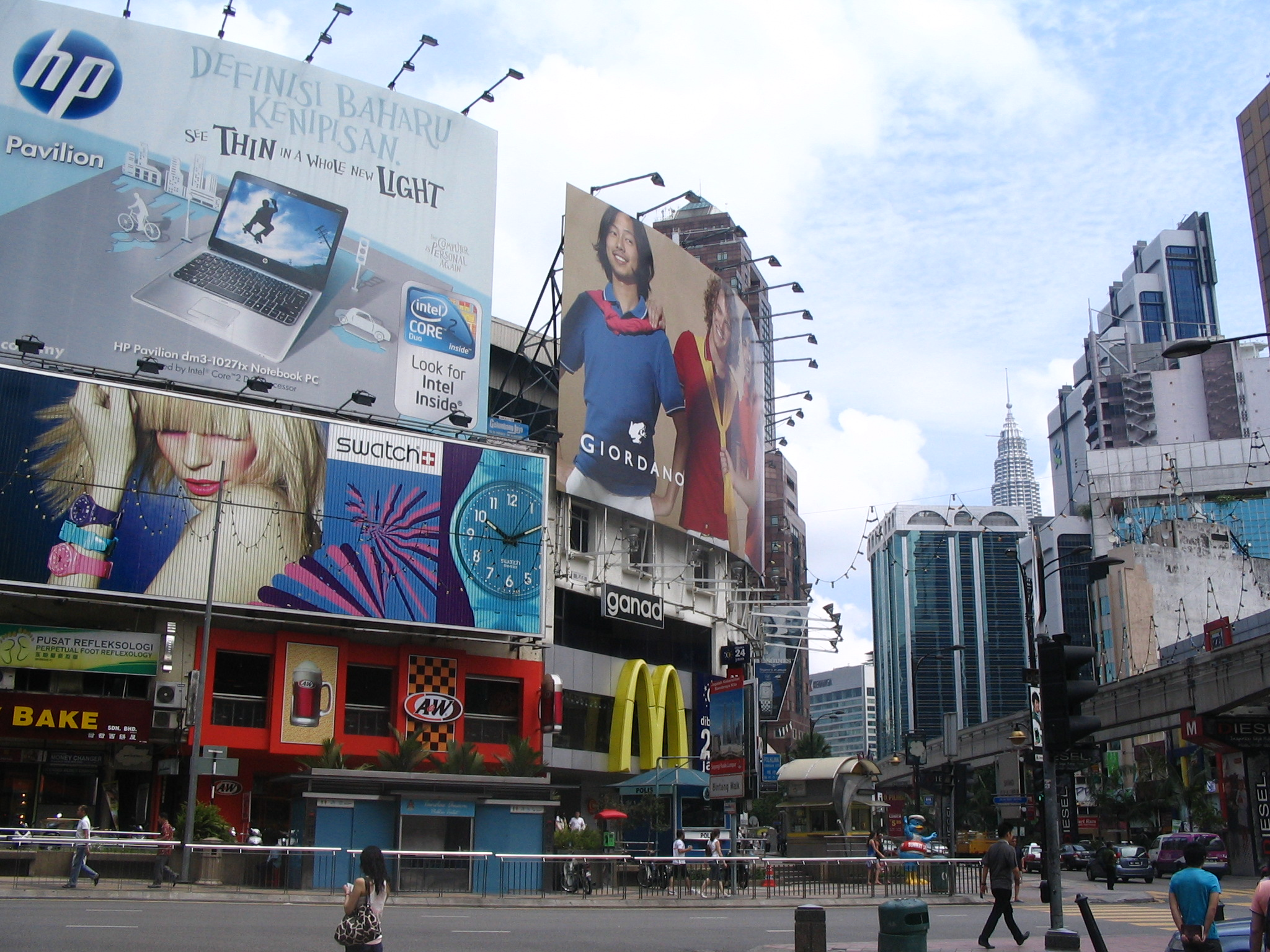
Bukit Bintang in 2010

Around the 1980s and 1990s, Bukit Bintang experienced problems with prostitution and illegal human trafficking. So the government took the initiative to enforce the areas of Bukit Bintang, Changkat Bukit Bintang, Changkat Thambi Dollah, Imbi and Jalan Alor to be raiding areas for prostitutes and now prostitution activities are reduced. In the late 1980s, Yeoh Tiong Lay proposed a rejuvenated retail cluster in Kuala Lumpur. He started retail developments through a conglomerate YTL Corporation and branded the area as Bintang Walk.

== Bintang Walk ==
Bintang Walk refers to the more developed stretch along the main Bukit Bintang Road and Sultan Ismail Road roads, with the intersection of these two roads as its axis. This place has been transformed over the last five years to become one of the city's trendiest and busiest shopping clusters. Street furniture line the pavements here. Upscale cafes, restaurants and clubs continue to make their presence felt here. On weekends, thousands of locals and tourists throng Bintang Walk and its shopping centres. Many major nightlife events take place here, such as the New Year's countdown, Merdeka eve celebrations, street concerts and parties. The annual Malaysian F1 Grand Prix pit stop and Guinness St Patrick's Day celebrations are held here too.

There are two major annual fashion events held here annually. The STYLO Fashion week as well as the glitzy annual Malaysia International Fashion Week.

== Shopping ==
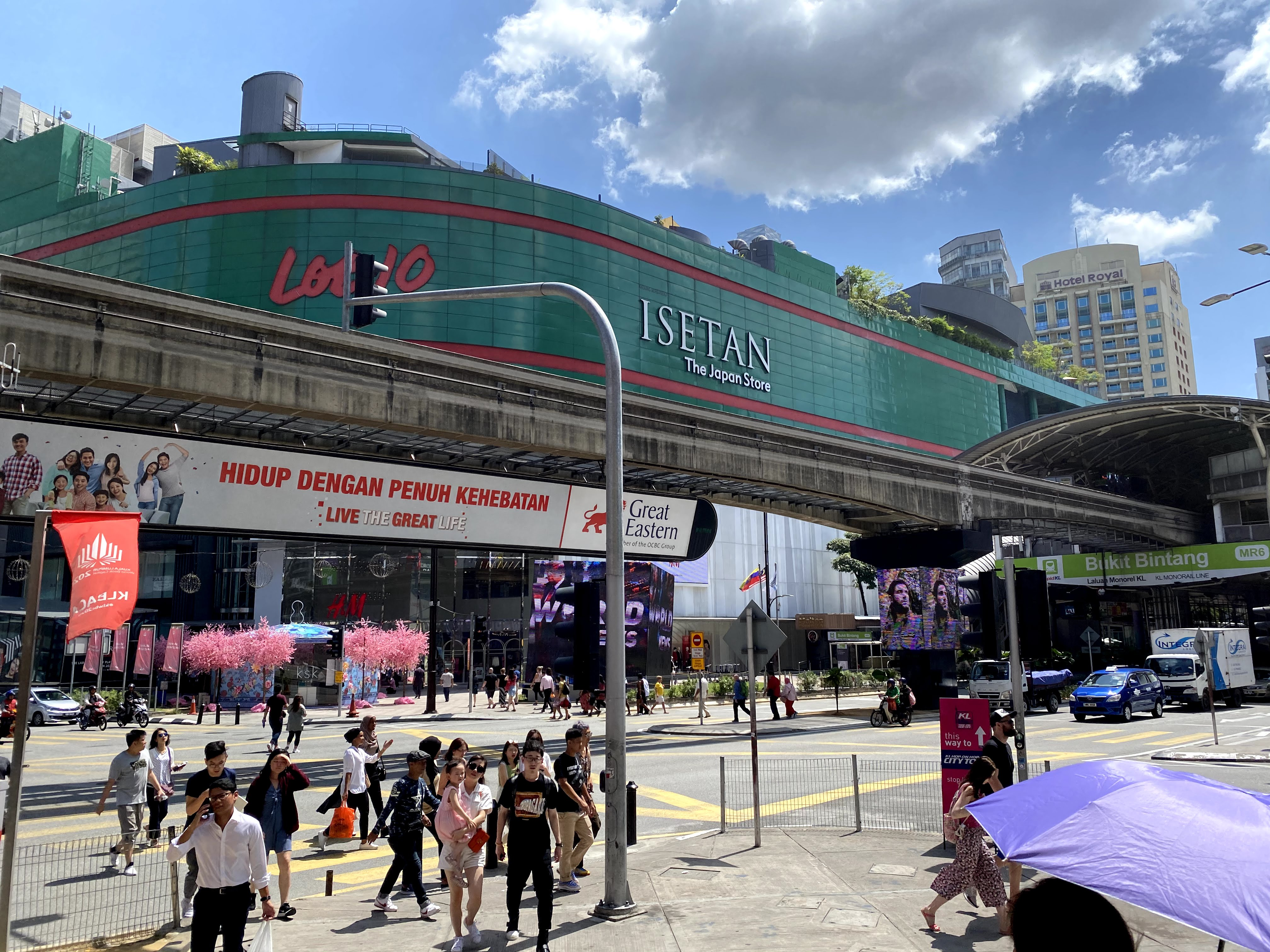
Lot 10 from across the junction in 2020

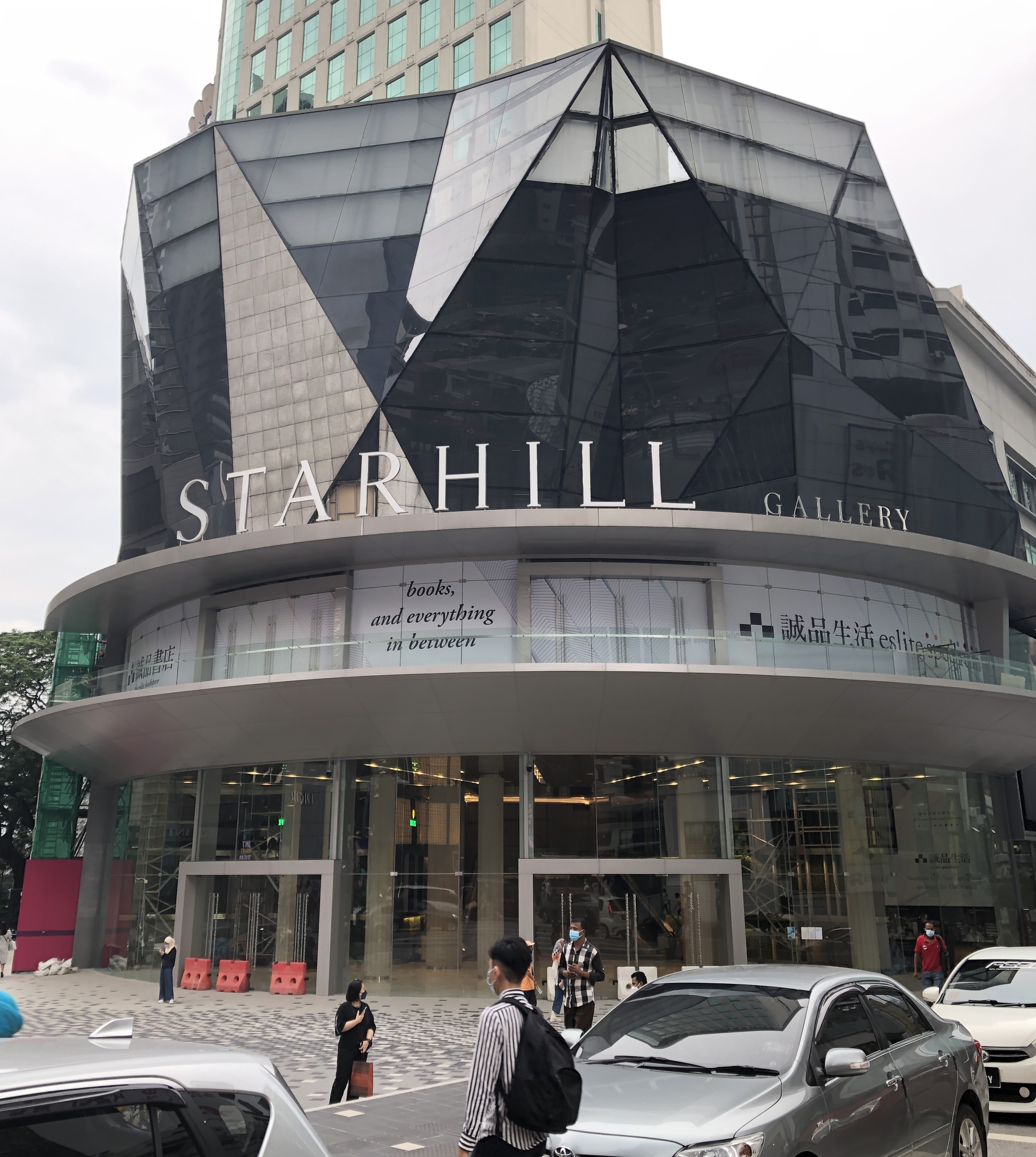
The Starhill in 2021

Bukit Bintang is one of the city's shopping districts. Many of the city's major retail malls are located in this area, including Berjaya Times Square, Imbi Plaza, Fahrenheit 88, Low Yat Plaza, Starhill Gallery, Sungei Wang Plaza, Lot 10, Pavilion Kuala Lumpur and LaLaport Bukit Bintang City Centre.

LaLaport BBCC from Jalan Hang Tuah in 2022

Imbi is a commercial area located near Bukit Bintang and being a popular tourist spot, the district is especially crowded during public holidays and peak hours. The Berjaya Times Square shopping complex and hotel is located in Imbi. Imbi Road is the main road running through this area.

=== List of shopping malls ===
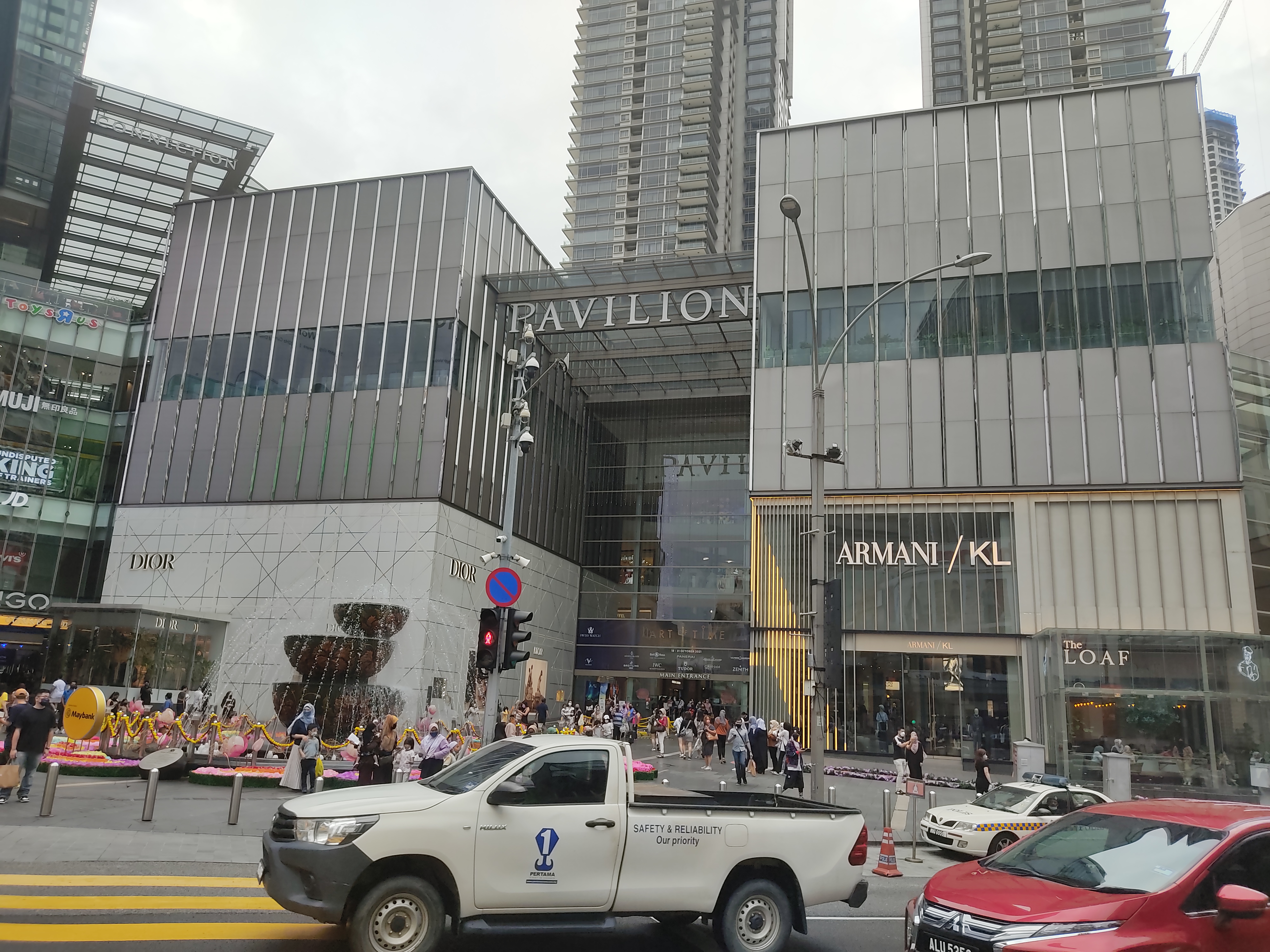
Main entrance of Pavilion Kuala Lumpur in 2021

- Berjaya Times Square - The 13th biggest shopping mall in the world boasting 12 levels of retail with a total of 3,500,000 square feet (330,000 m^{2}) floor area. Although it was initially aimed at the upper-echelon of society, it is currently positioned as a middle-class shopping mall offering youth fashion targeted at the younger crowds. Berjaya Times Square Theme Park is the largest indoor theme park in Malaysia, located on the 5th and 7th floors of the building.
- The Starhill - Refurbished in 2021, it houses some of the most luxurious brands alongside Suria KLCC. The first Eslite Bookstore and Eslite Spectrum in Southeast Asia as well as a Louis Vuitton flagship outlet flanks the exterior facade of this grand structure. Luxury fashion houses such as Christian Dior, Kenzo and Valentino and luxury watch boutiques such as Rolex, Bedat & Co, Hublot, Audemars Piguet and Jaeger-Le Coultre have an outlet here. JW Marriott Kuala Lumpur is connected to the mall through a "Time Tunnel" while a link bridge connects Ritz-Carlton Kuala Lumpur.
- Pavilion Kuala Lumpur (Pavilion KL) - Built-in late 2007, it is targeted at the middle-upper segment of society. It offers a diverse tenant mix which makes it one of the more popular malls in Kuala Lumpur. Dadi Cinema and Parkson are the anchor tenants of this mammoth 7-storey retail podium. A plethora of luxury boutiques ranging from Hermes, Celine, Ermenegildo Zegna, Diane von Fürstenberg to Italian fashion doyens like Furla, Gucci, Miu Miu, Fendi and Prada are also located there. Former Prime Minister Tun Dr Mahathir Mohamad had opened his very own bakery, The Loaf, located strategically next to the main entrance until its closure in 2023.
- Fahrenheit 88 - Renamed and refurbished in September 2010, the mall is the successor of the deteriorating KL Plaza. It consists of 300,000 square feet (28,000 m^{2}) of lettable space spread over 5 levels of zoned shopping space. A designated zone for IT gadgets is similar to Low Yat Plaza, named Signature@IT. This mall caters largely to homegrown, middle-priced retailers despite being anchored by Japanese retailers Uniqlo.
- Lot 10 - When it was opened in 1989, it was considered the Harrods-equivalent of Malaysia housing designer outlets like Aigner and Versace. Nowadays it is widely reckoned as a mid-range retail destination as most outlets have shifted due to competition and degradation. Widespread refurbishment to the mall was done at a cost of RM20 million. Existing anchor Isetan has undergone a facelift. The entrance is flanked by Jonetz by Don Don Donki, and H&M, popular Swedish multinational retail-clothing outlet.
- Plaza Low Yat - The ultimate one-stop centre for electronic gadgets. The ratio between IT outlets and F&B outlets are 70:30.
- Sungei Wang Plaza - Despite opening in 1977 and being the oldest mall in the area, it remains a popular destination for gamers and thrifty shoppers. The plaza features low-cost items, service businesses, Giant grocery store and was formerly anchored by Parkson.
- LaLaport BBCC (Officially known as Mitsui Shopping Park LaLaport Bukit Bintang City Centre) - It is the first LaLaport to open in Southeast Asia by Mitsui Fudosan Co. Ltd. The mall is named after the Bukit Bintang City Centre (BBCC) development where it was built. It consists of 1.4 million square feet across 6 levels of retail with anchor tenants namely Jaya Grocer supermarket, Metrojaya department store, Nitori furniture store, Nojima, Rollerwa skating rink, MR DIY, MR TOY and BookXcess. LaLaport BBCC was opened to the public on 20 January 2022 as a soft opening. The Malaysia Grand Bazaar is also located right next to the mall which forms part of the BBCC entertainment hub, and was dubbed as the first artisanal mall to open in Kuala Lumpur.
- The Exchange TRX - A luxury mall within the Tun Razak Exchange financial district located along Jalan Tun Razak. The mall is anchored by Aurum Theatre of GSC Cinemas, Seibu department store and Mercato supermarket with other smaller anchor tenants including UNIQLO, LC Waikiki, H&M, Muji and MPH Bookstores. It also comes with a 10-acre park that sits on top of the mall, with a few open squares and F&B establishments. The Exchange TRX mall was opened on 29 November 2023 and has a direct connection to the Tun Razak Exchange MRT station beneath the complex.
- 118 Mall - An upcoming 7-storey shopping mall with a glass dome roof featuring of more than 300 stores and 12 cinema halls. The mall is currently under construction at the base of Merdeka 118, the second-tallest building in the world.
- Imbi Plaza - located right opposite of Berjaya Times Square.
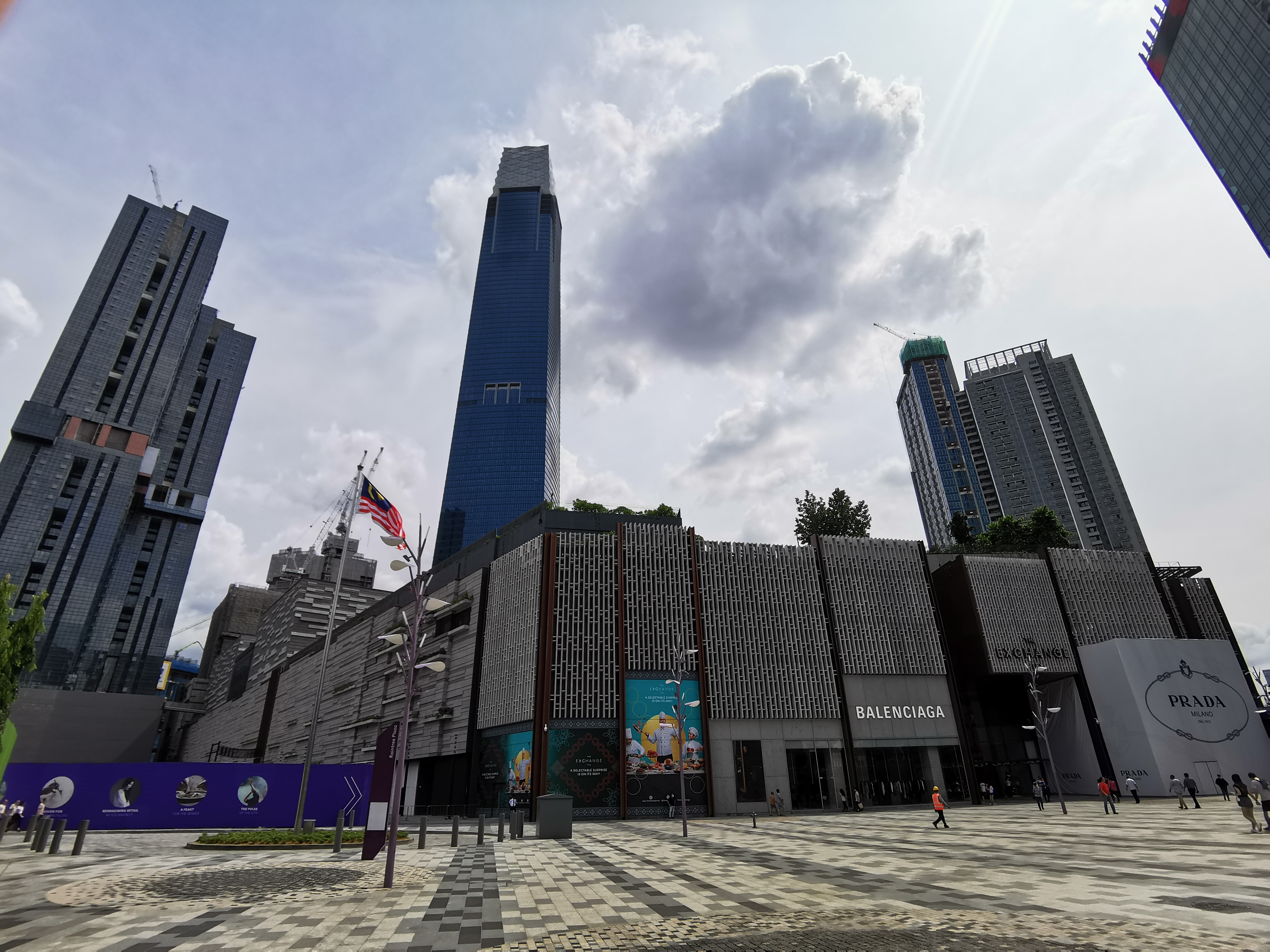
  The Exchange TRX from The Raintree Plaza in 2023. The Exchange 106 tower can also be seen in the background.

== Food ==
=== Bintang Walk ===
Restaurants dedicated to Arabian gastronomy have been sprouting along with the core of the Bintang Walk of late due to a recent general initiative to lure Arab tourists to this region. Popular Maghreb and Lebanese alongside Iranian delicacies are increasingly served by restaurants. However, plenty of trendy restaurants cater to international fare, especially in the BB park area.

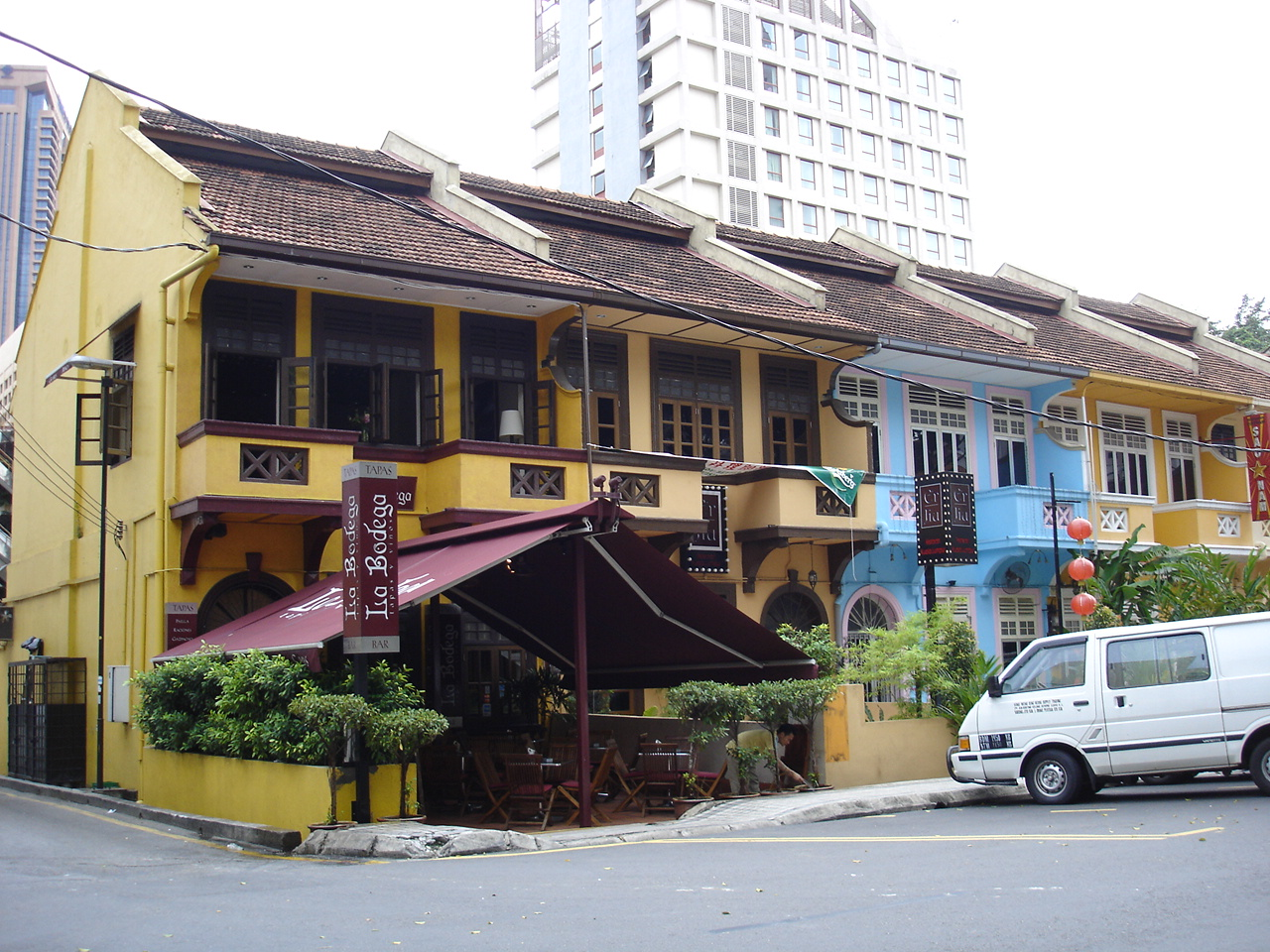
Pre-war houses along Tengkat Tong Shin near Changkat Bukit Bintang refurbished into trendy eateries.

==== "Hutong" on Lot 10 ====
Hutong is referred to as Malaysia's first gourmet heritage village, a food court inspired by the Old China influences. The term Hutong is commonly associated with narrow alleys in Beijing's oldest neighbourhoods. Located on the lower ground floor of Lot 10, this newly revamped food court features 25 street food stalls selling locally renowned and established Chinese eateries scoured across Kuala Lumpur and Singapore. It is directly connected to Bintang Walk via an escalator.

==== BB Park ====
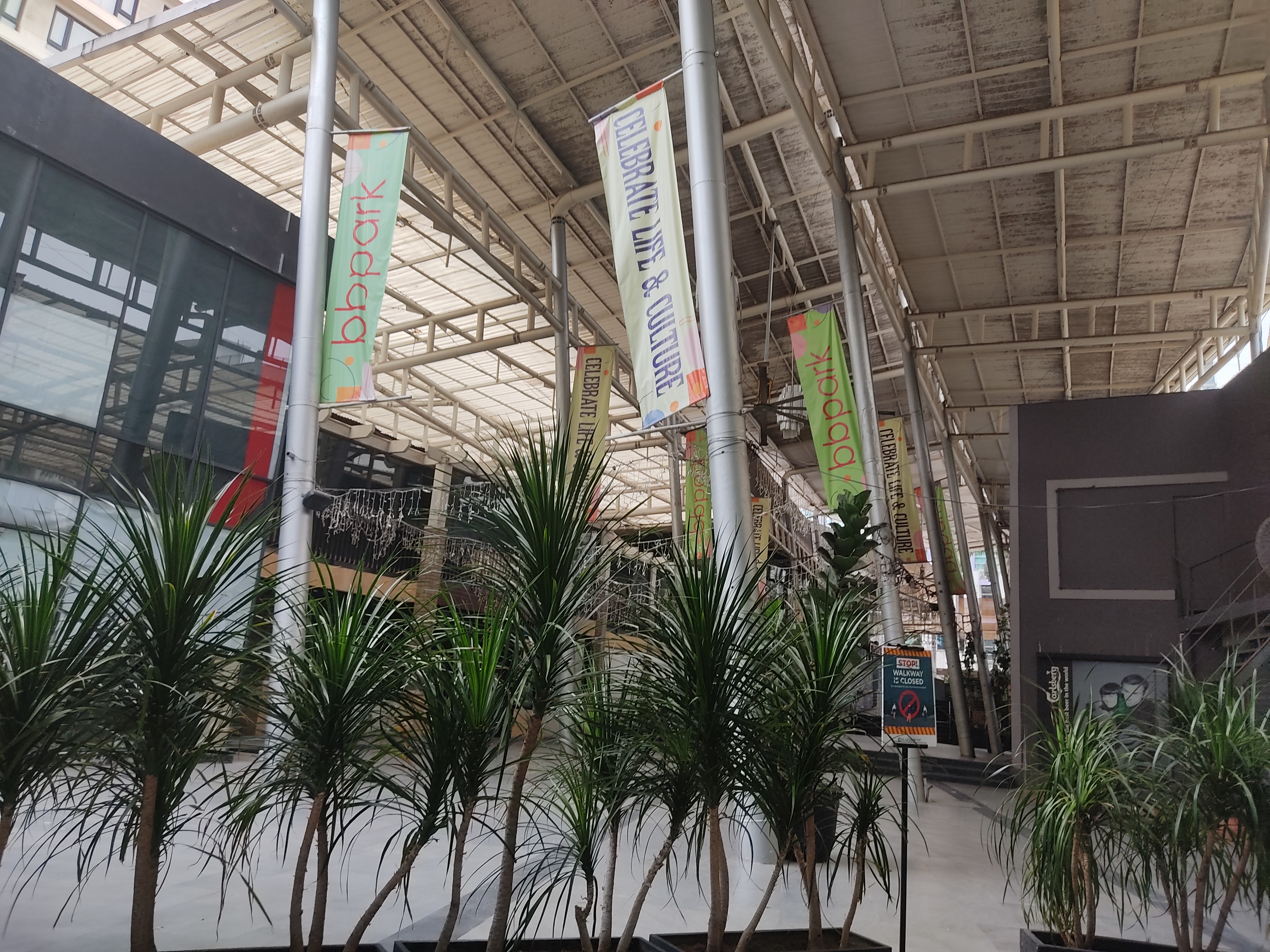
BB Park as of October 2021, not operating due to the pandemic

Previously an entertainment park owned by Low Yat Plaza and Sons Realty, BB Park has been extensively revamped to keep abreast with changing times. Its axis is located along the lower section of Bintang Walk, and its concept revolves around social dining and cultural themes. It hosts themed restaurants in a semi-open-air setting that serves up mainly foreign foods, including French and German cuisines. The park features live entertainment in live bands and cultural shows and are held during some weekdays alongside during weekends. Besides food joints, some of BB Park's tenants include local art galleries.

=== Changkat Bukit Bintang ===
Changkat Bukit Bintang is located perpendicular to Bintang Walk and Alor Street. This is the upmarket gastronomy district of Bukit Bintang. Fine dining joints line the street. It boasts pre-war, colonial buildings which have been refurbished into upmarket restaurants and pubs, serving up Western dining. Changkat Bukit Bintang is also home to one of Kuala Lumpur's hippest and happening party venues. The street is also home to brothels as well as massage parlors offering "happy endings", it is best known as one of Kuala Lumpur's red light districts.

=== Alor Street ===
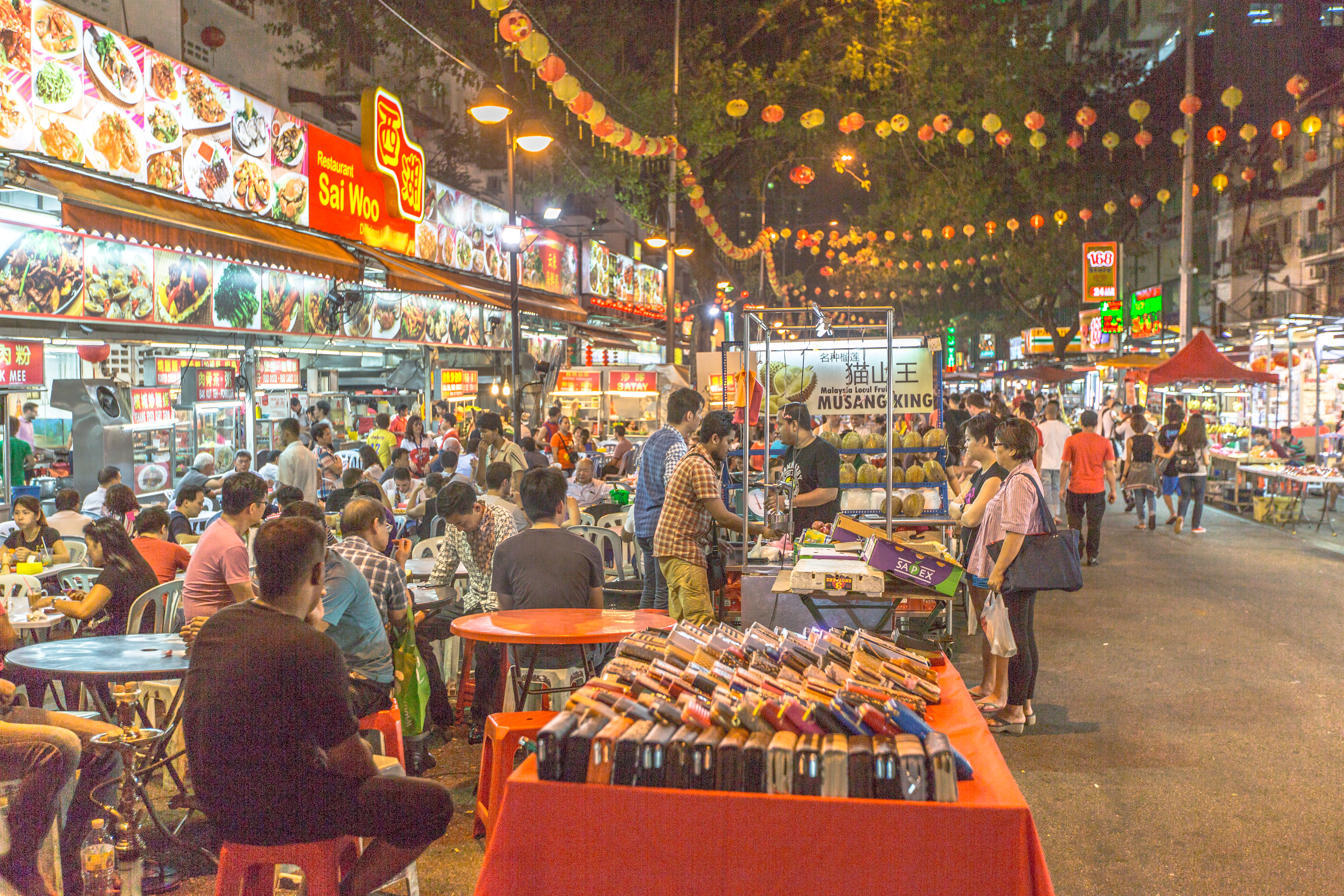
Chinese hawker stalls along Alor Street (Jalan Alor)

Alor Street, or Jalan Alor in Malay, is an entire street dedicated to cheap hawker food of mainly local Chinese cuisines. Located within walking proximity of Bintang Walk, it is popular among the locals for offering food served in a traditional open-air atmosphere, with chairs and tables dotting the curbs and road-sides. This is a place burgeoning with activity both during night and day. While some hawkers erect stalls along curbs, others operate food stalls from utilitarian restaurants.

== Indoor theme park ==
Berjaya Times Square Theme Park is a theme park located between level 5 and 7 of Berjaya Times Square. It is Malaysia's largest indoor theme park, measuring 133,000 square feet (12,400 m^{2}). It features both children rides and thrill rides.

== Spa and foot reflexology ==
The Bintang Walk district is famous for its specialist foot/body massages and spas-related services. There are numerous shops along the district offering different types of massages inspired by Chinese traditions. These stores also provide exotic foot treatments. These incorporate reflexology, which stimulates acupressure points on foot. Among the claimed benefits of the foot, massages are better blood circulation, cures to specific ailments and a balanced, detoxified body. In these shops, patrons sit on reclining long chairs and spend up to an hour or more getting their feet treated to a thorough massage. Duration and types of massages measure charges. The shops are usually open till the wee hours of the morning, which is when the bulk of the business comes.

== Accessibility ==
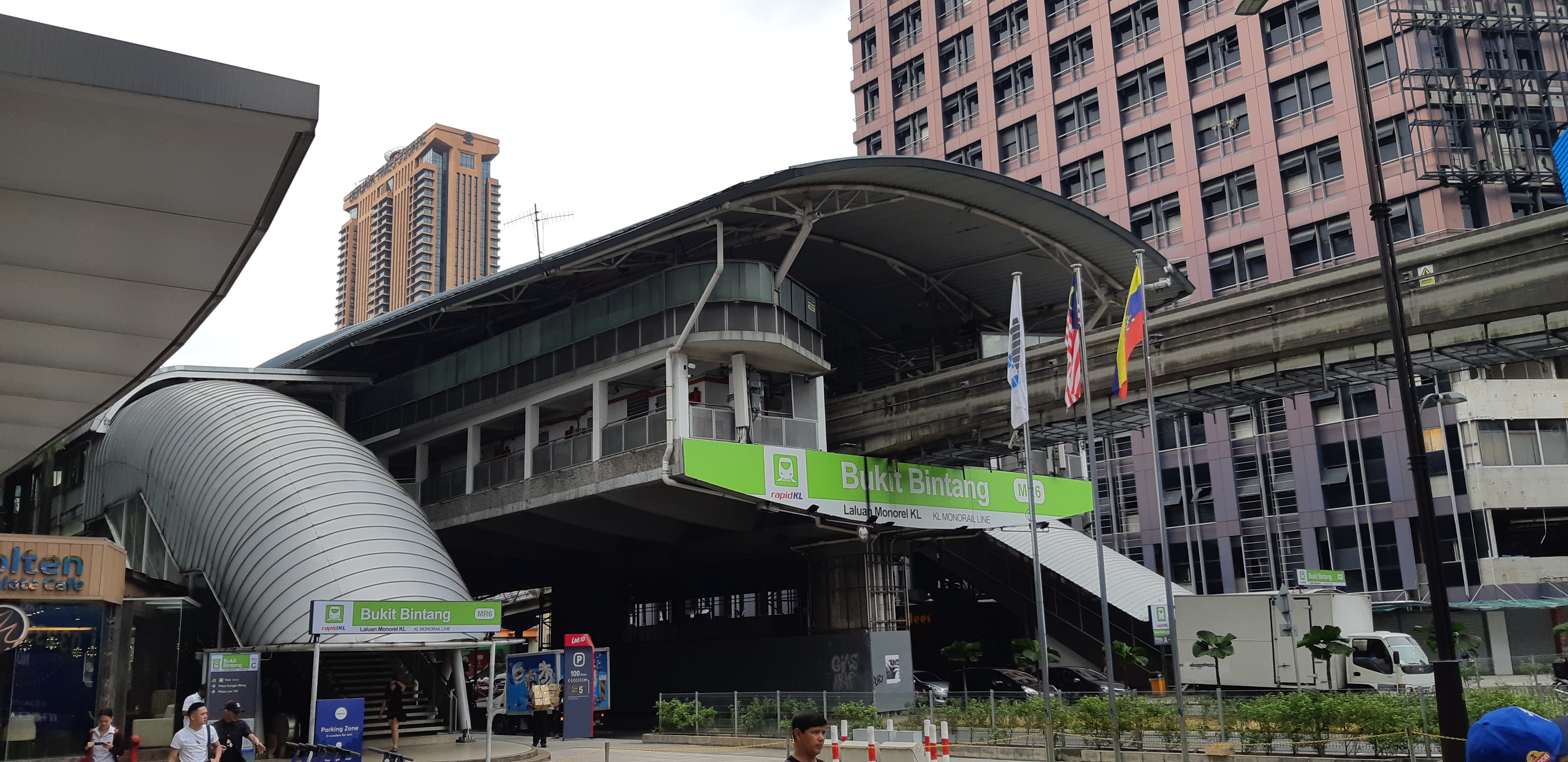
Bukit Bintang Monorail Station (Kuala Lumpur Monorail)

=== Public transport ===
==== Monorail ====
Bintang Walk is accessible via the Bukit Bintang Monorail station, which is located at the intersection of Sultan Ismail Road and Bukit Bintang Road (between Lot 10 and Sungei Wang Plaza); further south is the Imbi Monorail station which is connected by a pedestrian bridge to Berjaya Times Square. The Raja Chulan Monorail station is connected to Pavilion Kuala Lumpur and an elevated pedestrian walkway links it to Suria KLCC (and ultimately the KLCC LRT station on the LRT Kelana Jaya Line). All 3 stations are served by the KL Monorail.

==== Mass Rapid Transit (MRT) ====
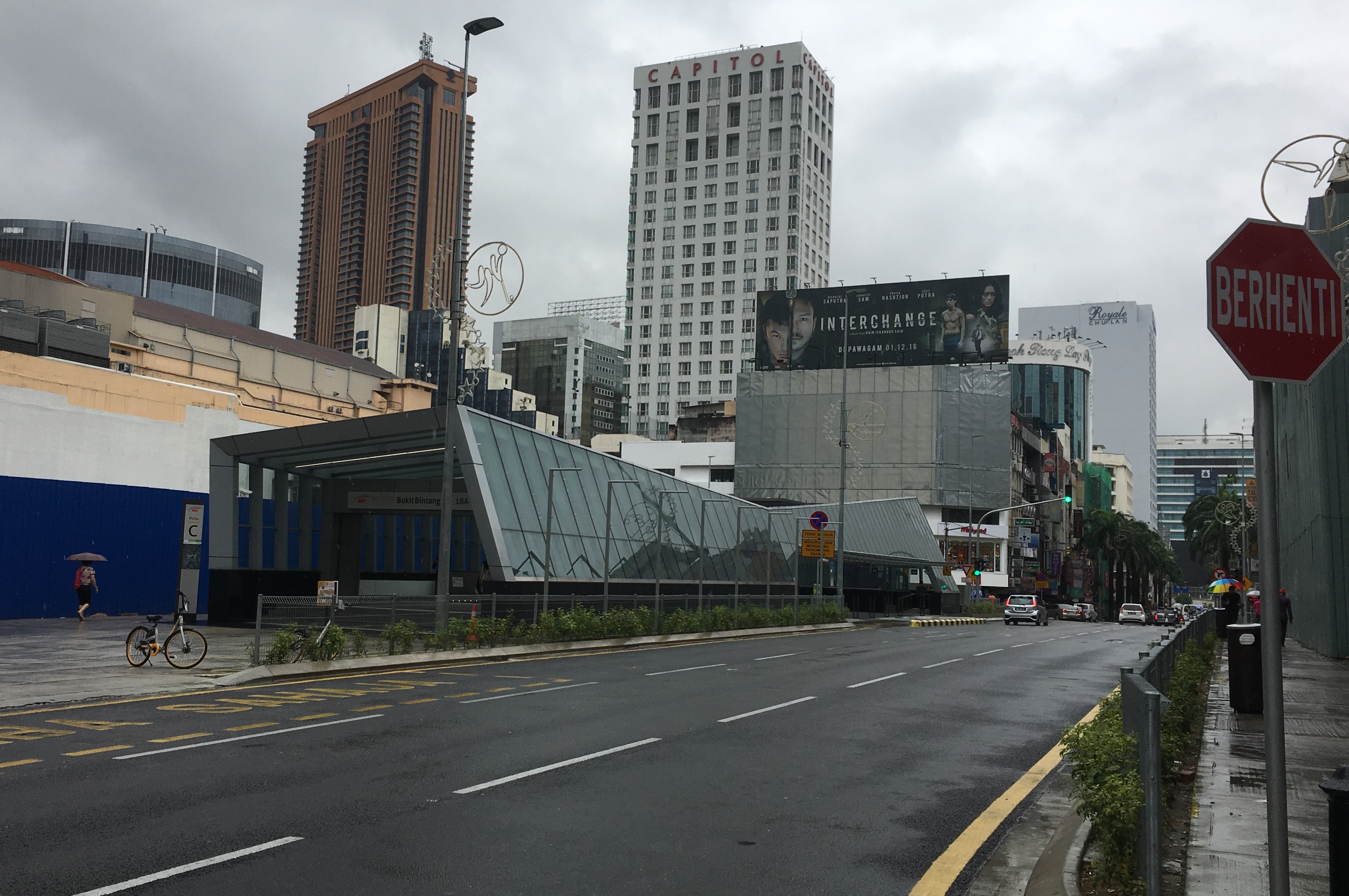
Entrance C of Bukit Bintang MRT station (Kajang line)

Bintang Walk is accessible via the underground Bukit Bintang MRT station, part of the MRT Kajang Line, opened on 17 July 2017 as part of Phase 2 of the system. Early proposals envisioned two stations- Bukit Bintang East and Bukit Bintang West (alternately Bukit Bintang 1 and Bukit Bintang 2) which were later combined into one, and made into a connecting station (without paid zone integration) with the eponymous Monorail station. The MRT station features five exits, serving the nearby shopping malls.

=== Other access ===
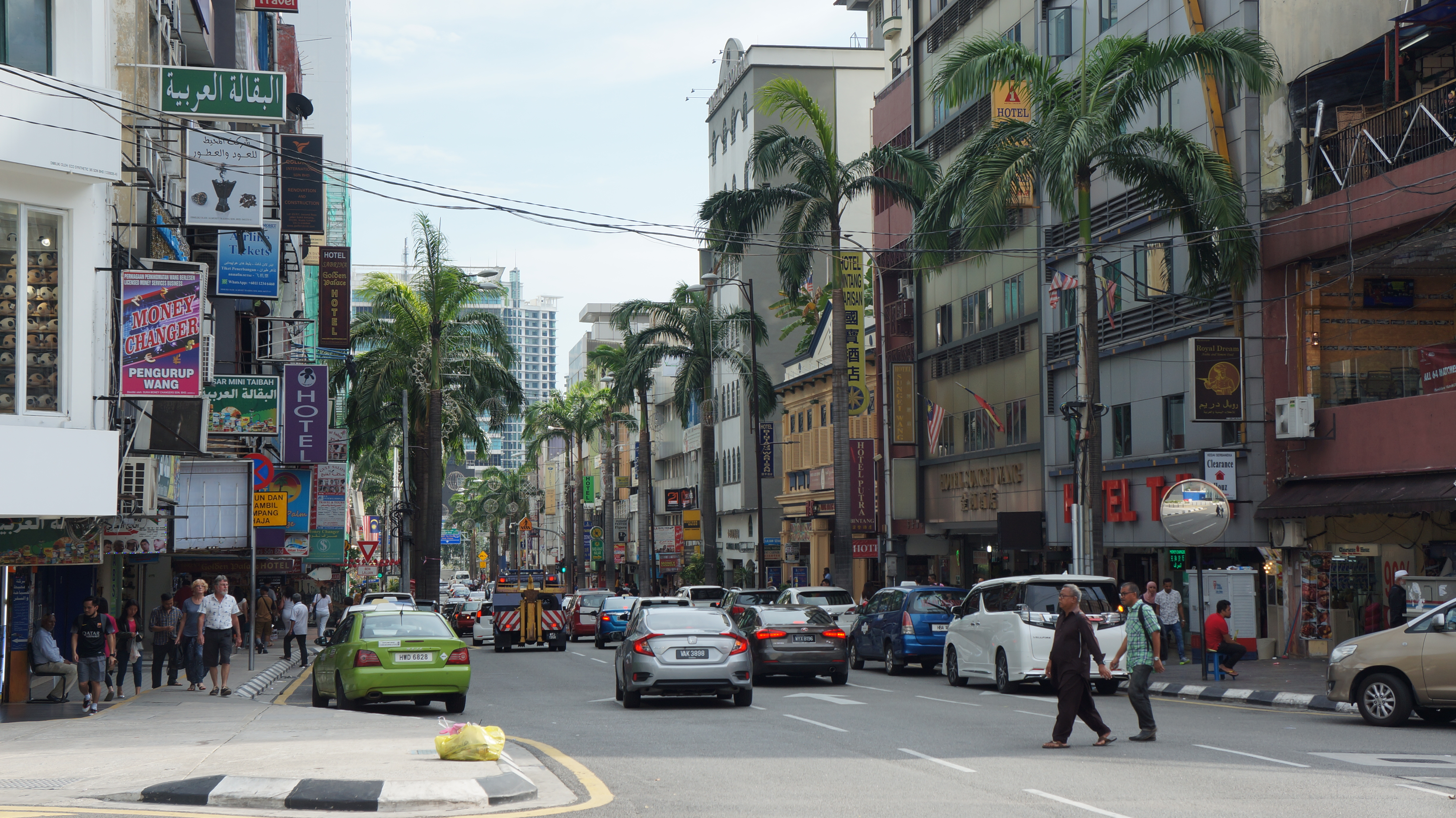
Jalan Bukit Bintang street after the diagonal crossing

In 2011, Petronas spent RM100 million under its social contribution programme to build an elevated, air-conditioned walkway from Suria KLCC shopping centre to Pavilion shopping centre in Bukit Bintang. The walkway includes a 562m long and five-metre wide elevated walkway that traverses through the busy areas of Pinang Road, Perak Road and Raja Chulan Road with escalator and staircase entry and exit points at strategic and convenient locations as well as security guards for the safety of the pedestrians. The walkway is also linked to the Raja Chulan Monorail station, Impiana Hotel and Kuala Lumpur Convention Centre. An average walk from Suria KLCC to Pavilion through the elevated walkway would take approximately 15 minutes.

== See also ==
- Bukit Bintang Girls' School, a previously colonial school, the site of the present Pavilion KL.
- Bukit Bintang City Centre, an integrated development located within KL's Golden Triangle.
- Orchard Road, Singapore's premier shopping haven.
- Fifth Avenue, New York's retail strip.
