= Low Yow Chuan =

Malaysian real estate and property developer (1932–2021)

- Education: B.S Architecture at University of New South Wales
- Occupations: real estate & property developer
- Board member of: Board member at Asia Pacific Land until 2002
- Children: 4

Chinese name
- Traditional Chinese: 劉耀全
- Simplified Chinese: 刘耀全
- Hanyu Pinyin: Liú Yàoquán
- Jyutping: Lau4 Jiu6 Cyun4

Tan Sri Low Yow Chuan (刘耀全) (20 September 1933 – 8 May 2021) was a Malaysian real estate and property developer. Low Yow Chuan and his four children own the Federal Hotel, which includes Hotel Capitol, Low Yat Plaza, and the Bintang Fairlane Residences, as well as other area properties.

Yow Chuan was board member at Asia Pacific Land until 2002. Following his retirement from the role, he continued to serve as Group Adviser for the company. As of 2006, the executive chairman position was held by his eldest son Low Gee Tat, while his other three children hold directorship positions.

== Personal life ==
He was born to a Chinese father, Low Yat, who in 1957 built Malaya's first international class hotel, Federal Hotel in Kuala Lumpur. Yow Chuan's father, the late Tan Sri Low Yat founded Low Yat Construction Company Sdn. Bhd. in 1947.

Yow Chuan studied architecture at the University of New South Wales, but in 1957, before he managed to graduate, he returned home to help with his father's business.

== Death ==
Yow Chuan died at the age 88 on 8 May 2021.

== Honours ==
=== Honours of Malaysia ===
- Malaysia
  - Commander of the Order of Loyalty to the Crown of Malaysia (PSM) – Tan Sri (1991)

=== Awards ===
In 2014 he received the Mayor's Commendable Award of the Kuala Lumpur Mayor's Tourism Awards 2014 for his significant contribution to the local tourism sector since the 1960s.

=== Places named after him ===
- Yow Chuan Plaza, Jalan Ampang/Tun Razak. (Demolished, now The Intermark City Square)
- Persiaran Tan Sri Low Yow Chuan, Bandar Tasik Puteri, Rawang, Selangor
