= JW Marriott Kuala Lumpur =

Skyscraper hotels in Kuala Lumpur

Coordinates: 3.14795°N 101.71382°E

JW Marriott Hotel Kuala Lumpur 吉隆坡JW万豪酒店
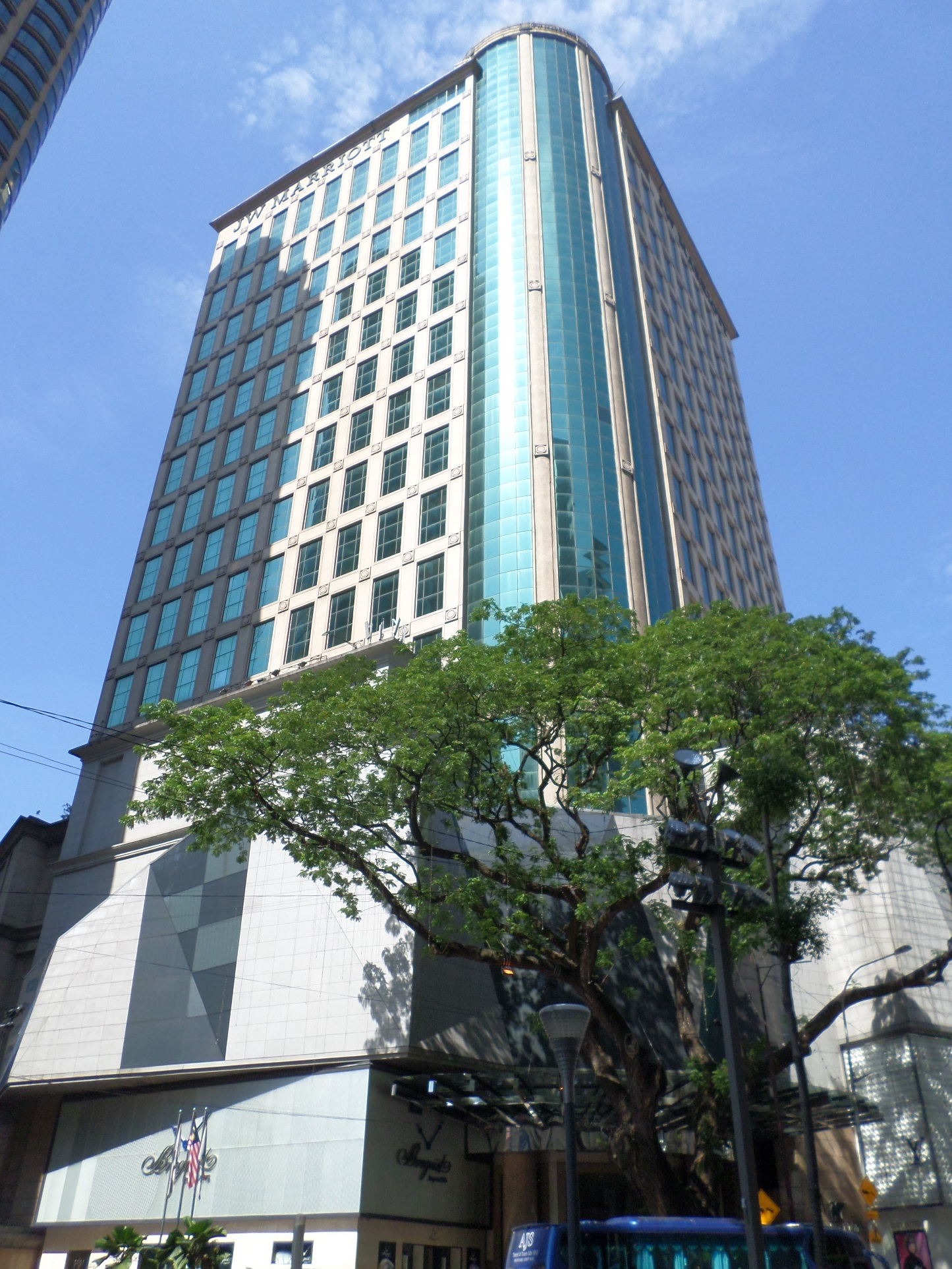

General information
- Location: Bukit Bintang, Kuala Lumpur, Malaysia
- Operator: Marriott International

Technical details
- Floor count: 29

Other information
- Number of rooms: 491
- Number of suites: 70
- Number of restaurants: 10
- Parking: Available

The JW Marriott, Kuala Lumpur is a hotel of the Marriott Hotel Group in Kuala Lumpur's central business district. It is 23 stories tall with 491 rooms, 20 meeting rooms- 32,927 sq ft (3,059.0 m^{2}) of total meeting space.

== History ==
YTL Corporation bought over the Kuala Lumpur JW Marriott hotel and two other properties in Kuala Lumpur through its subsidiary, YTL Land in 2005. The total purchase price was $85 million (RM323 million).

== Location ==
The JW Marriott Hotel is located in Kuala Lumpur's Golden Triangle.
