= Ritz-Carlton Kuala Lumpur =

Hotel in Kuala Lumpur, Malaysia

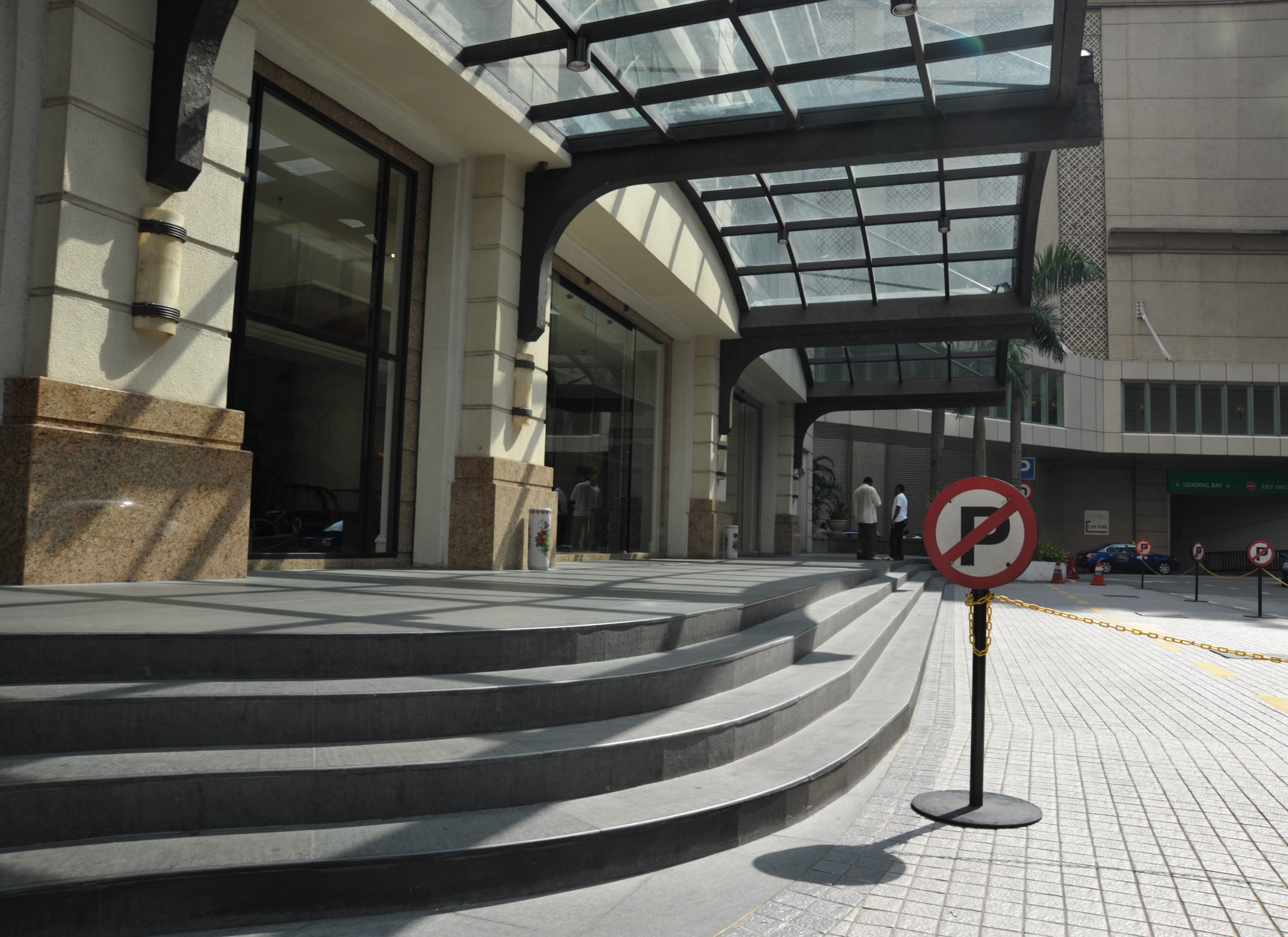

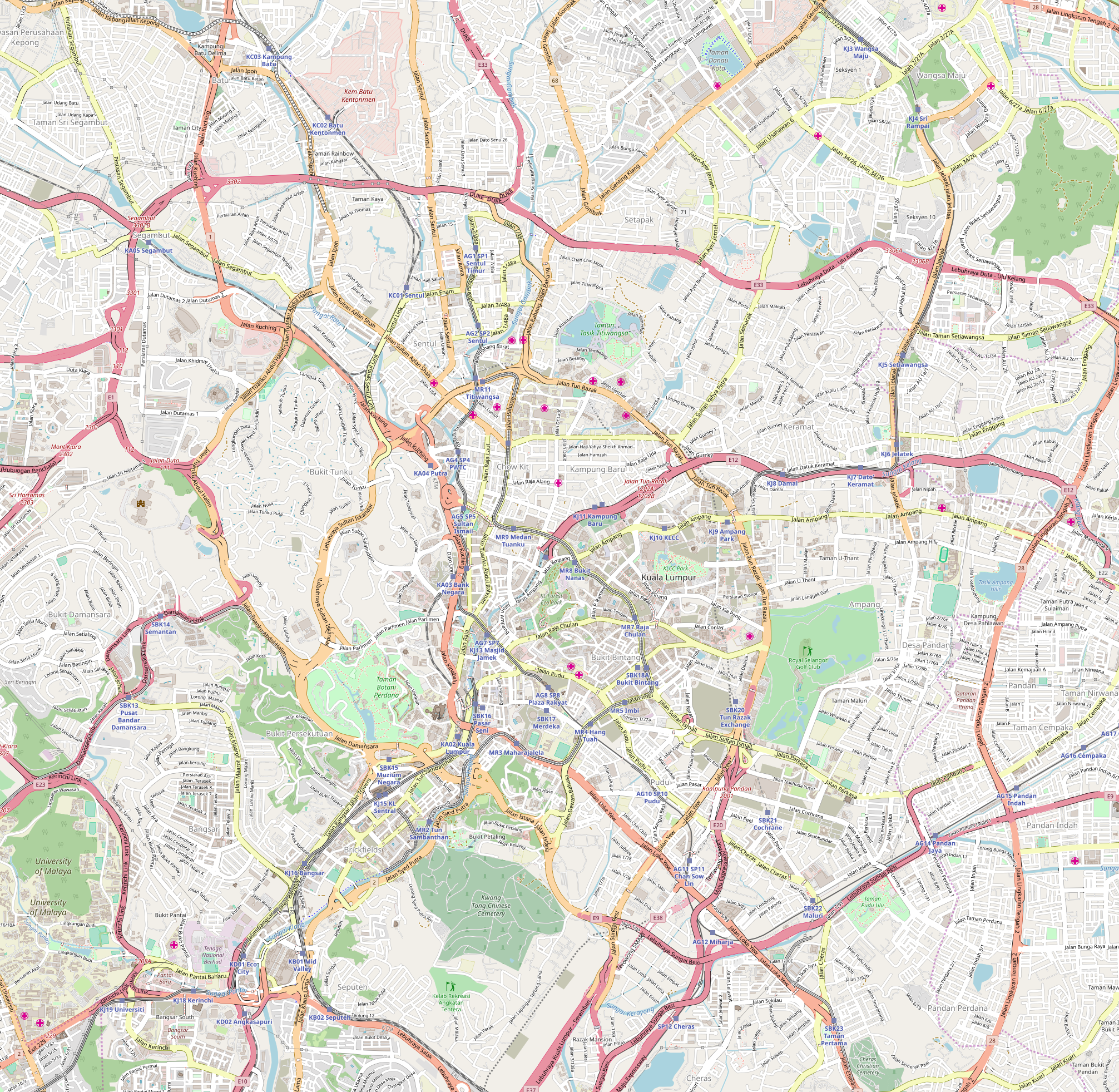
- Location in Kuala Lumpur

General information
- Location: Kuala Lumpur, Malaysia
- Coordinates: 3°8′49.78″N 101°43′0.26″E
- Opening: December 1, 1997
- Owner: YTL Corporation
- Operator: Ritz-Carlton

Other information
- Number of rooms: 248

Ritz-Carlton Kuala Lumpur is a luxury hotel in Kuala Lumpur, Malaysia. It opened on December 1, 1997, and contains 365 guest rooms. Former US President Barack Obama stayed there in his visit in April 2014, US President Donald Trump also paid his visit in October, 2025 during the 2025 ASEAN Summit.

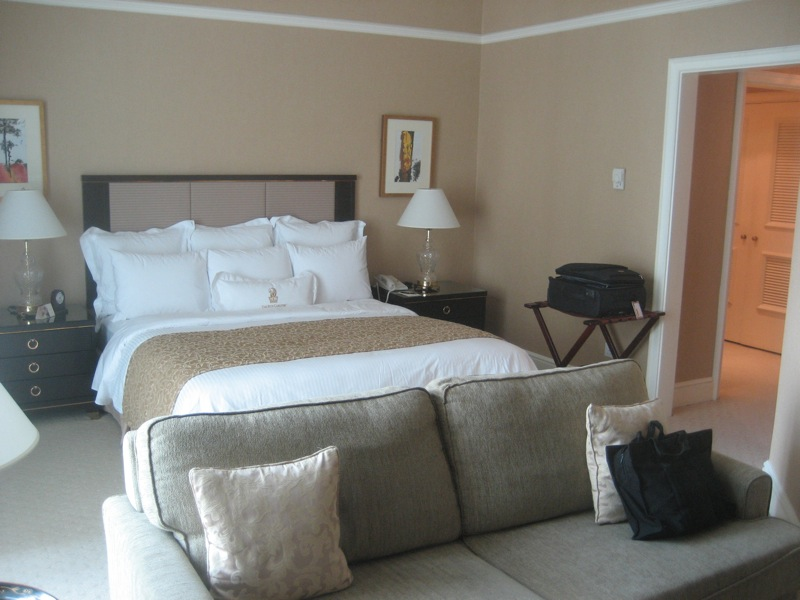
Hotel room
