= 2015 in Malaysia =

- Decades: 1990s; 2000s; 2010s; 2020s
- See also: Other events of 2015; History of Malaysia • Timeline • Years

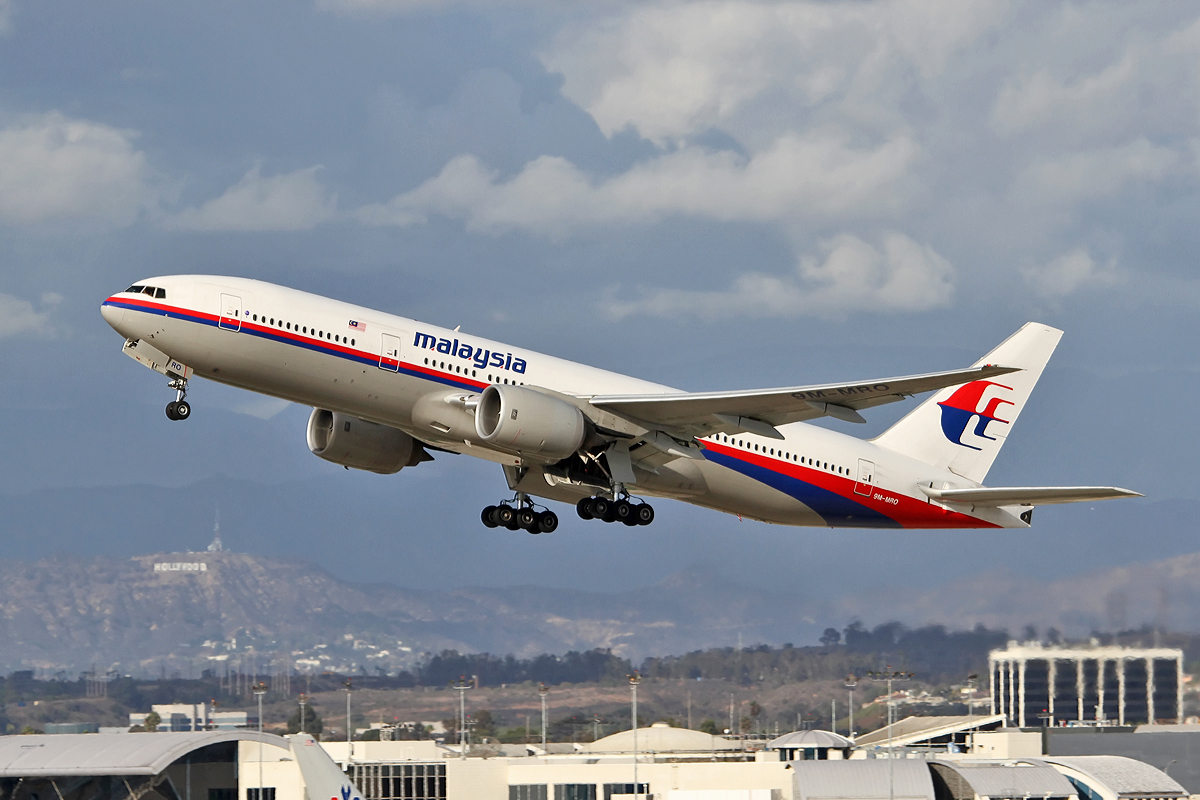
The Boeing 777-2H6ER of the Malaysia Airlines Flight MH370 which was reported missing on 8 March 2014. On 24 March 2014, the Malaysian government noted that the final location, determined by satellite communication, was far from any possible landing sites, and concluded, "Flight MH370 ended in the southern Indian Ocean". On 29 July, some of the debris of the MH370 were found at Réunion Island, France.

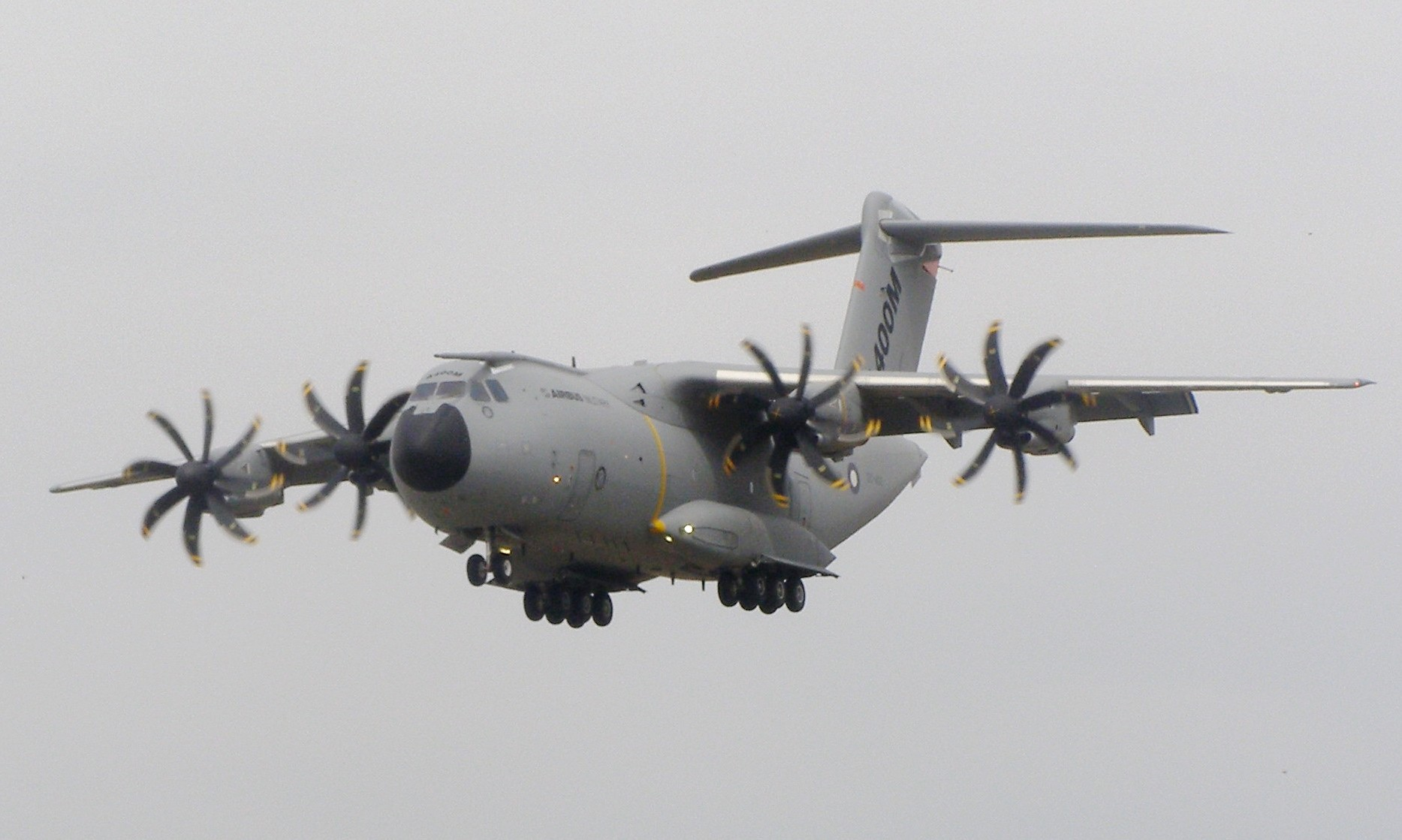
The Airbus A400M Atlas was delivered to the Royal Malaysian Air Force (RMAF) on 10 March.

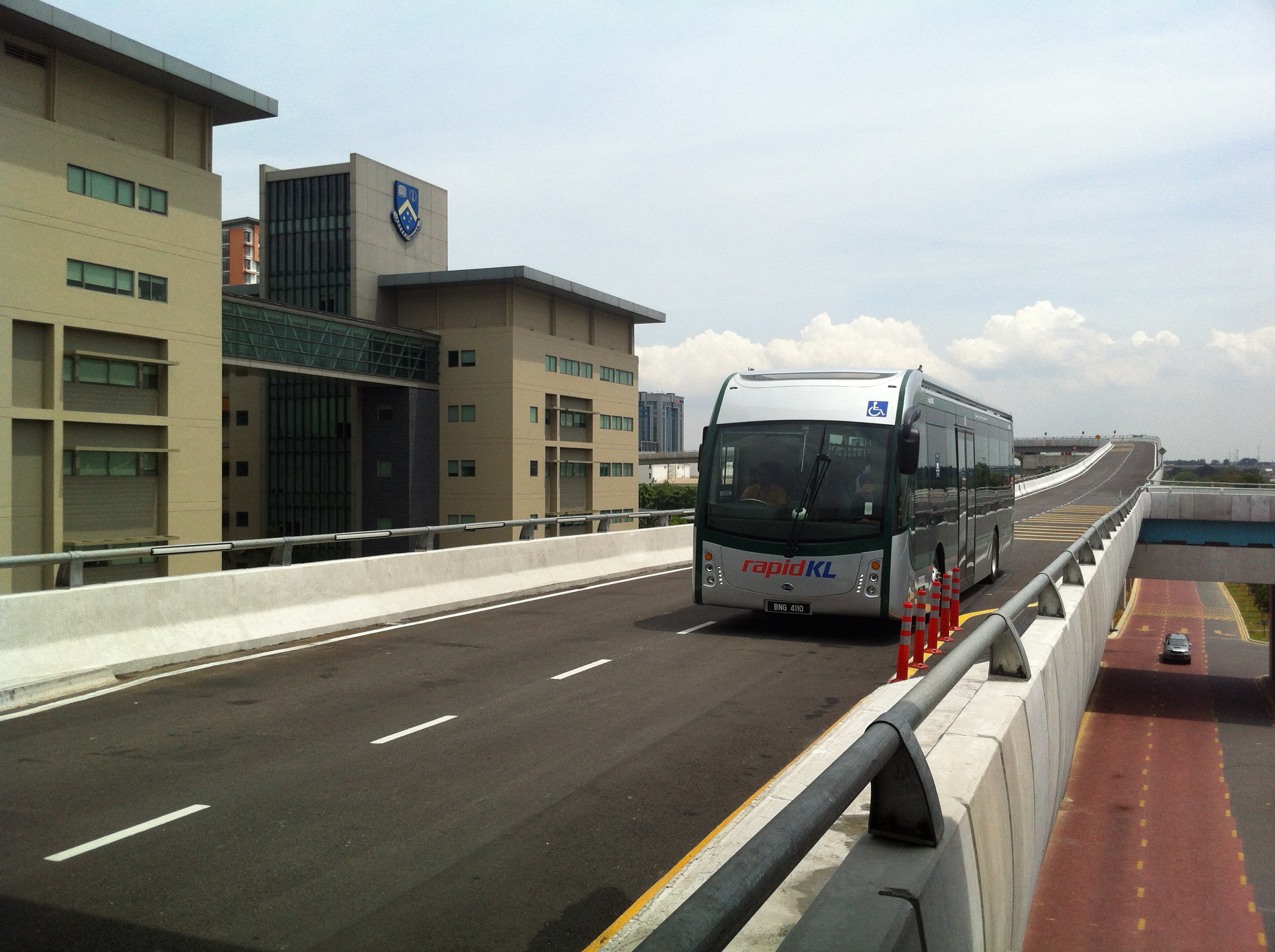
The BRT Sunway Line, the first bus rapid transit in Malaysia.

2015 in Malaysia is 58th anniversary of Malaysia's independence.

== Incumbents ==
=== Federal level ===
- Yang di-Pertuan Agong: Sultan Abdul Halim Mu'adzam Shah of Kedah
- Raja Permaisuri Agong: Sultanah Haminah Hamidun of Kedah
- Deputy Yang di-Pertuan Agong: Sultan Muhammad V of Kelantan
- Prime Minister: Mohammad Najib Abdul Razak
- Deputy Prime Minister:
  - Muhyiddin Yassin (until 28 July)
  - Ahmad Zahid Hamidi (from 29 July)
- President of the Dewan Negara: Abu Zahar Ujang
- Speaker of the Dewan Rakyat: Pandikar Amin Mulia
- Chief Justice: Arifin Zakaria

=== State level ===
- Johor:
  - Sultan of Johor: Sultan Ibrahim
  - Menteri Besar of Johor: Mohamed Khaled Nordin
- Kedah:
  - Sultan of Kedah: (Council of Regency of Kedah)
    - Tunku Sallehuddin (chairman)
    - Tunku Abdul Hamid Thani (Members I)
    - Tunku Puteri Intan Safinaz (Members II)
  - Menteri Besar of Kedah: Mukhriz Mahathir
- Kelantan:
  - Sultan of Kelantan: Sultan Muhammad V
  - Menteri Besar of Kelantan: Ahmad Yaakob
- Perlis:
  - Raja of Perlis: Tuanku Syed Sirajuddin
  - Menteri Besar of Perlis: Azlan Man
- Perak:
  - Sultan of Perak: Sultan Nazrin Muizzuddin Shah
  - Menteri Besar of Perak: Zambry Abdul Kadir
- Pahang:
  - Sultan of Pahang: Sultan Haji Ahmad Shah Al-Musta'in Billah
  - Menteri Besar of Pahang: Adnan Yaakob
- Selangor:
  - Sultan of Selangor: Sultan Sharafuddin Idris Shah
  - Menteri Besar of Selangor: Mohamed Azmin Ali
- Terengganu:
  - Sultan of Terengganu: Sultan Mizan Zainal Abidin
  - Menteri Besar of Terengganu: Ahmad Razif Abdul Rahman
- Negeri Sembilan:
  - Yang di-Pertuan Besar of Negeri Sembilan: Tuanku Muhriz
  - Menteri Besar of Negeri Sembilan: Mohamad Hasan
- Penang:
  - Governor of Penang: Tun Abdul Rahman Abbas
  - Chief Minister of Penang: Lim Guan Eng
- Malacca:
  - Governor of Malacca: Tun Mohd Khalil Yaakob
  - Chief Minister of Malacca: Idris Haron
- Sarawak:
  - Governor of Sarawak: Tun Abdul Taib Mahmud
  - Chief Minister of Sarawak: Adenan Satem
- Sabah:
  - Governor of Sabah: Tun Juhar Mahiruddin
  - Chief Minister of Sabah: Musa Aman

== Events ==
=== January ===
- 1 January
  - The price of RON95 and diesel has reduced by 35 sen (RM1.91 per litre) and 30 sen (RM1.93 per litre) respectively.
  - The Malaysia Year of Festival 2015 officially begins.
  - One Malaysian was killed in the stampede at Chen Yi Square, Shanghai, China on New Year's Eve.
- 1 January – The Indonesia AirAsia Flight QZ8501 crash:
  - The first two bodies from the AirAsia Flight QZ8501 crash have arrived back in Surabaya, Indonesia.
- 2 January – The Indonesia AirAsia Flight QZ8501 crash:
  - Three more bodies were identified at the Disaster Victim Identification centre here before they were handed over to the respective families.
- 5 January – 2014–2015 Peninsular Malaysia floods:
  - Part of the East–West Highway from Gerik, Perak to Jeli, Kelantan has now reopened to traffic after series of landslides that hit the highway.
- 6 January – The Indonesia AirAsia Flight QZ8501 crash:
  - Four air traffic controllers have been suspended for failing to check the approved flight schedule for AirAsia QZ8501.
- 6 January – Malaysia takes a seat as a non-permanent member of the UN Security Council.
- 6 January – 2014–2015 Peninsular Malaysia floods:
  - Part of the East Coast Expressway from Karak to Jabur has now reopened to traffic after being hit by flash floods.
- 7 January – The Indonesia AirAsia Flight QZ8501 crash:
  - Part of the tail of crashed Indonesia AirAsia flight QZ8501 has been found in the Java Sea.
- 10 January – Launch of Malaysia Year of Festival 2015 at Merdeka Square, Kuala Lumpur, Malaysia.
- 11 January – The Indonesia AirAsia Flight QZ8501 crash:
  - The black boxes of the Flight QZ8501 has been found.
- 11 January – A three-minute and 21-second video of a Korean pop (K-pop) band member, B1A4 hugging three fans wearing tudung (headscarf) on stage has gone viral on internet. Federal Territory Islamic Religious Department (Jawi) investigate the event following the band's inappropriate behaviour during the event.
- 12 January – The Indonesia AirAsia Flight QZ8501 crash:
  - The flight data recorder of the Flight 8501 has been sent to Jakarta for analysis.
- 12 January – Major Zaidi Ahmad, A Royal Malaysian Air Force officer was found guilty of breaching two standing orders and breaking protocol in revealing problems with the indelible ink used in the 2013 Malaysian general election. He was sacked from his job in Malaysian Armed Forces by a military court-martial.
- 13 January
  - Human rights lawyer, Eric Paulsen is arrested in sedition probe.
  - Two former police commandos, Chief Inspector Azilah Hadri and Corporal Sirul Azahar Umar, were sentenced to death after the Federal Court allowed the government's appeal over the murder of Mongolian model Altantuya Shaariibuu in 2006.
- 14 January – The Indonesia AirAsia Flight QZ8501 crash:
  - The main body wreckage of the Flight QZ8501 has found at Java Sea.
- 15 January
  - Eight people, including the driver of a tour bus, died while 21 others were injured when the bus burst into flames after crashing into a car at KM326.2 on the southbound lane of the North–South Expressway near Tapah interchange, Perak.
  - Official opening of the Menara Kembar Bank Rakyat in KL Sentral, Kuala Lumpur by the Prime Minister, Mohammad Najib Abdul Razak and Jalan Travers is renamed as Jalan Rakyat.
- 17 January – Sixty-nine-year-old Wan Hashim Wan Mahmood created another history by cycling across five countries to complete his tour of Southeast Asia.
- 17 January – 2015 East Malaysian floods
  - Several parts of Sabah and Sarawak were hit by flash floods.
- 18 January – A police officer, ASP Mohamad Hasnal Jamil, who was involved in the bloody incident in Kampung Air Siminul, Semporna, Sabah, during the 2013 Lahad Datu standoff on 2 March 2013, which saw 10 enemies shot dead, and 14 more caught, while six security personnel lost their lives, was awarded the Bintang Keberanian Kedah (BKK) medal for bravery from the Sultan of Kedah, Sultan Abdul Halim Mu'adzam Shah.
- 21 January – Former police commando Sirul Azhar Omar has been detained by Australian immigration officials in Brisbane, Queensland, Australia over his conviction for the murder of Mongolian Altantuya Shaariibuu.
- 24 January – Tengku Ampuan Tua Intan Zaharah of Terengganu, 4th Raja Permaisuri Agong (1965–1970), a consort of Sultan Ismail Nasiruddin Shah of Terengganu and also grandmother of current Sultan Mizan Zainal Abidin of Terengganu, died at the age of 86 in Pantai Hospital, Kuala Lumpur due to pneumonia. Her body was brought back to Terengganu and laid to rest near husband grave in the Royal Mausoleum near Abidin Mosque, Kuala Terengganu. Terengganu declared 40 days of mourning begins 24 January until 1 March.
- 29 January – Malaysia Airlines Flight MH370 crash:
  - The Department of Civil Aviation Malaysia (DCA) officially declared that the disappearance of Malaysia Airlines flight MH370 over Indian Ocean is an "accident" in accordance with the Standards of Annexes 12 and 13 to the ICAO's Chicago Convention and all 227 of the passengers and 12 crews onboard flight MH370 are presumed to have lost their lives. However, the search for the missing Flight MH370 will continue.
- 31 January – The completion works and full official opening of the East Coast Expressway Phase 2 from Jabur to Kuala Terengganu.

=== February ===
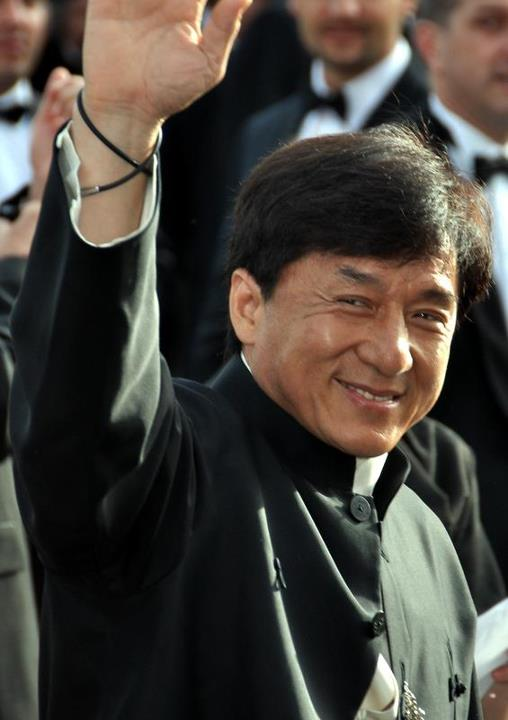
"Datuk" Jackie Chan.

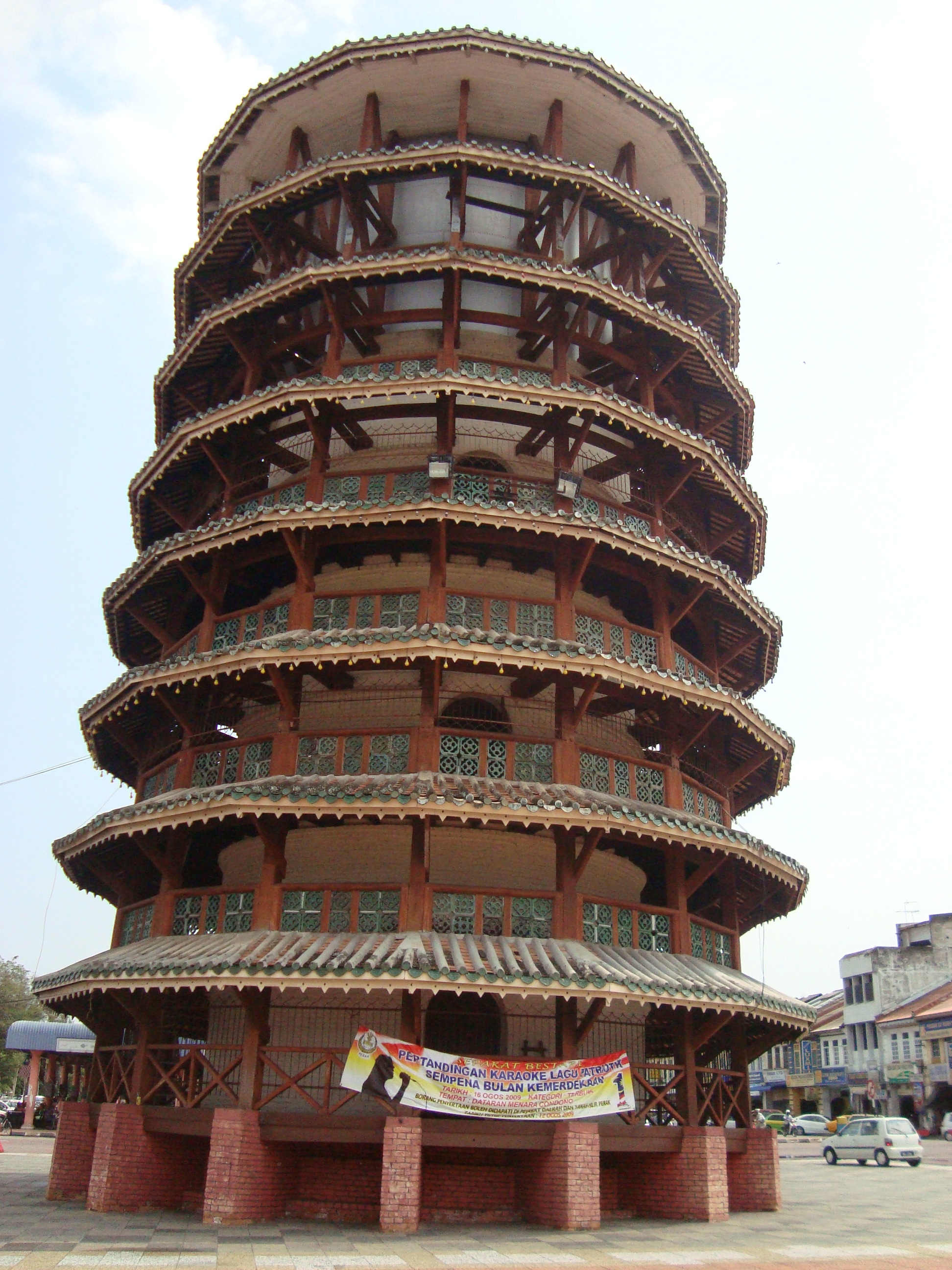
Leaning Tower of Teluk Intan in Teluk Intan, Perak.

- 1 February
  - The fuel prices has dropped between RM0.11 and RM0.23. The RON 95 down by RM0.21 to RM1.70, RON 97 down by RM0.11 to RM2.00 and diesel down by RM0.23 to RM1.70, per litre.
  - Hong Kong international superstars, Jackie Chan received the Panglima Mahkota Wilayah (PMW) award which carried the title Datuk from the Yang di-Pertuan Agong, Sultan Abdul Halim Mu'adzam Shah of Kedah in conjunction with the 41st Federal Territory Day.
- 2 February
  - A 20-year-old Universiti Teknologi MARA (UiTM) student, Nursyuhada Johari died after her throat was slit, allegedly by a male friend at KM228.2 of the North–South Expressway near Bukit Gantang, Perak.
  - Malaysia's squash queen Nicol David created a new world record for the length of time a squash player who has topped the world rankings, after marking her 106th month as world number one in the latest February Women's Squash Association (WSA) list.
- 9 February – Datuk Wan Zulkiflee Wan Ariffin, has been named the new group chief executive officer and president of Petroliam Nasional Berhad (Petronas) effective 1 April 2015 to 31 March 2018.
- 10 February – Federal Court upholds conviction of opposition leader, Anwar Ibrahim, finds him guilty of sodomising former aide Saiful Bukhari and was sentenced five-year prison by the Federal Court. Later, Anwar was taken to Sungai Buloh Prison in Sungai Buloh, Selangor after his trial verdict.
- 10 February – The Indonesia AirAsia Flight QZ8501 crash:
  - The body of the only Malaysian passenger, Sii Chung Huei, in the Indonesia AirAsia Flight QZ8501 crash in the Java Sea last 28 December, was identified by Indonesian authorities.
- 11 February – The Indonesia AirAsia Flight QZ8501 crash:
  - The body of sole Malaysian passenger, Sii Chung Huei, in the Indonesia AirAsia QZ8501 crash in the Java Sea arrived at the Royal Malaysian Air Force (RMAF) base in Kuching, Sarawak and was taken to the family's house and later to Nirvana Memorial Park in Siniawan near Kuching.
- 12 February
  - Former Menteri Besar of Kelantan and also Pan-Malaysian Islamic Party (PAS) spiritual leader, Nik Abdul Aziz Nik Mat, died at the age of 84 at his residence in Kampung Pulau Melaka, Kota Bharu, Kelantan at evening.
  - Some 200 people gathered at the gates of the Sungai Buloh Prison at night in a display of solidarity with imprisoned Anwar Ibrahim, turning the area into a sea of lights as they laid down candles all over the compound.
- 13 February – More than 10,000 people pay their respects for the late Nik Aziz at Masjid Tok Guru mosque in Kampung Pulau Melaka, Kota Bharu including Malaysian Prime Minister, Mohammad Najib Abdul Razak, Chief Minister of Penang Lim Guan Eng, DAP Advisor Lim Kit Siang, Minister of Agriculture and Agro-Based Industry Mustapa Mohamad, Menteri Besar of Kelantan Ahmad Yakob and Menteri Besar of Kedah Mukhriz Mahathir. Then, his body was laid to rest at Kampung Pulau Melaka Muslim cemetery.
- 16 February – The proposed Kinrara–Damansara Expressway (KIDEX Skyway) project is officially cancelled by the Selangor State Government.
- 24 February – The family of Anwar Ibrahim has submitted an application for a royal pardon over his sodomy conviction.
- 25 February – 2015 Chempaka by-election:
  - UMNO-Barisan Nasional (BN) will not contested the Chempaka by-elections and will focuses for the post-flood recovery programme in Kelantan.
- 28 February – The Leaning Tower of Teluk Intan in Teluk Intan, Perak has been declared as a National Heritage of Malaysia by the Department of National Heritage, Malaysia.

=== March ===
- 1 March – The fuel prices has increased to RM0.25. The RON 95 up by to RM1.95, RON 97 down to RM2.25 and diesel up to RM1.95, per litre.
- 3 March – Malaysia Airlines Flight MH17 crash:
  - Relatives of those killed when Malaysia Airlines Flight MH17 was downed over eastern Ukraine visited a Dutch air base to view the wreckage of the plane.
- 3 March – The district flags of Johor are introduced.
- 4 March – Heavy rain for over an hour in the Kuala Lumpur caused flash flood and massive traffic congestion in Cheras Highway near the Taman Billion roundabout.
- 5 March – Sapura Kencana Petroleum Bhd's vice chairman Mokhzani Mahathir resigns.
- 7 March – More than 2,000 people marched through Kuala Lumpur to demand the release of opposition leader Anwar Ibrahim, who was jailed last month for five years on sodomy charges.
- 8 March – The first anniversary of the Malaysia Airlines Flight MH370 crash.
- 10 March –
  - Prime Minister, Mohammad Najib Abdul Razak witnessed the signing of a water deal which will see Negeri Sembilan buying treated water from Malacca via Syarikat Air Melaka Berhad (SAMB). The agreement inked between SAMB and Syarikat Air Negeri Sembilan Sdn Bhd (SAINS) had touched on several matters including the maximum supply of 5,000 cubic metre of water a day for 5,000 households in Tampin, Negeri Sembilan and 100 households in Batang Melaka, Malacca.
  - The first batch of the four Airbus A-400M Atlas to the Royal Malaysian Air Force (RMAF).
- 11 March – Deputy PAS spiritual leader, Datuk Dr. Harun Din become new PAS spiritual leader replacing Nik Abdul Aziz Nik Mat.
- 13 March
  - Myanmar president Thien Sein made his three-day official visit to Malaysia and meets his counterpart Mohammad Najib Abdul Razak.
  - Bank Negara Malaysia's Governor, Zeti Akhtar Aziz is awarded the Wharton's Dean Award from the University of Pennsylvania.
- 15 March
  - Japan became the first country to conduct high level talks with Malaysia over possible involvement in the proposed high speed train project between Kuala Lumpur and Singapore.
  - Two Jupiter Aerobatic Team aircraft belonging to the Indonesian Air Force (TNI-AU) crashed during a practice session conjunction with the 2015 Langkawi International Maritime and Aerospace Exhibition (LIMA '15) exhibition at the Mahsuri International Exhibition Centre (MIEC) in Langkawi, Kedah.
- 16 March – Lembah Pantai Member of Parliament (MP), Nurul Izzah Anwar, the eldest daughter of jailed Opposition Leader Anwar Ibrahim, was arrested under the Sedition Act when she turned up at the Dang Wangi police station, as requested, to give a statement on the KitaLawan rally of 7 March.
- 17–21 March – The 2015 Langkawi International Maritime and Aerospace Exhibition (LIMA 2015) is held in Langkawi, Kedah.
- 22 March – 2015 Chempaka by-election:
  - PAS candidate Ahmad Fathan Mahmood has won the Chempaka state seat by-election with a landslide victory with 10,092 votes beating four Independent candidate, Sharif Mahmood, Fadhillah Hussin, Aslah Mamat, and Izat Bukhary Ismail Bukhary.
- 23 March
  - Sultan Ibrahim ibni Almarhum Sultan Iskandar is crowned as the 25th Sultan of Johor and the fifth in the Temenggong dynasty and his consort Raja Zarith Sofiah is crown as Permaisuri of Johor.
  - More than 100 protesters from the Anti-GST group managed to break through the security to enter the Royal Malaysian Customs Complex headquarters in Kelana Jaya, Selangor to demand that the department delay the implementation of the Goods and Services Tax (GST) on 1 April.
- 30 March – One of the rubber tyres of a four-car Rapid KL monorail train caught fire at the Titiwangsa station in the morning, resulting in the temporary suspension of the monorail service in Kuala Lumpur.
- 31 March – George Town, Penang has been granted city status. The Municipal Council of Penang Island (MPPP) has been upgraded to Penang Island City Council (MBPP). Datuk Patahiyah Ismail is appointed as the first Datuk Bandar (Mayor) of Penang Island. She is the first female mayor for Penang Island and was also the first woman municipal president since 2010.

=== April ===
- 1 April – The implementation of the Goods and Services Tax (GST) in Malaysia.
  - All goods and services are subject to 6% GST beginning midnight on 1 April.
- 1 April – The Pardons Board has rejected opposition leader Anwar Ibrahim's petition for royal pardon over his sodomy conviction. Later, Anwar Ibrahim has been disqualified as a Permatang Pauh Member of Parliament (MP).
- 2 April – The implementation of the Goods and Services Tax (GST)
  - All telecommunication company prepaid phone card users have to pay the 6% GST.
- 3 April – A six-year-old girl died after falling from the second floor of the Kenanga Wholesale City Mall in Kuala Lumpur.
- 4 April – Six people were killed including former Minister of Science, Technology and Innovation and also Rompin Member of Parliament, Jamaluddin Jarjis and a businessman, CEO of SP Baiduri Sdn Bhd Tan Huat Seang and also a Private Secretary in the Prime Minister's Office, Azlin Alias in a helicopter crash along Jalan Sungai Lalang in Kampung Pasir Baru near Semenyih, Selangor about 4:55 pm, the incidents involving a helicopter, AS 3655N2 Dauphin (Registration Number 9M-1GB).
- 5 April – The 9M-1GB helicopter crash:
  - The US flag at its embassy in Kuala Lumpur is flown at half-mast as a mark of respect for the late Jamaluddin Jarjis who died in a helicopter crash in Semenyih, Selangor.
  - The body of helicopter crash victim, Private Secretary in the Prime Minister's Office, Azlin Alias, was buried at the Batu 13 cemetery, Jalan Cheras, Kuala Lumpur, while the body of Jamaluddin Jarjis was buried outside Makam Pahlawan at the Masjid Negara compound, Kuala Lumpur.
- 6 April – The 9M-1GB helicopter crash:
  - Dewan Rakyat observes a minute of silence for the late Jamaluddin Jarjis.
- 6 April – Digital television broadcasting (DTV) will be introduced in Malaysia.
- 7 April – The Prevention of Terrorism Act (POTA) 2015 bill has now passed by the Dewan Rakyat.
- 10 April – The opening of Magic Art 3D Museum in Bukit Katil, Malacca.
- 12 April – Serian becomes twelve division of Sarawak.
- 15 April – Prime Minister, Mohammad Najib Abdul Razak launched the Bank of China, Malaysia as the Renminbi (RMB) Offshore Clearing Bank for Malaysia.
- 16 April – AirAsia CEO and co-founder Tony Fernandes has been named among the 100 most influential people in the world by Time magazine.
- 20 April – The residents of Taman Medan in Petaling Jaya, Selangor protested against the new church and a cross at this townships.
- 21 April
  - The Tunnel Boring Machine (TBM) tunneling works for the underground section of the MRT Sungai Buloh–Kajang Line are completed.
  - A trailer rammed into a gantry signboard, causing a massive traffic jam along an 8 kilometre stretch of Skudai Highway near Bandar Baru UDA in Johor Bahru, Johor.
- 23 April – Members of the Employees Provident Fund (EPF) retain their right to withdraw their money at the age of 55.
- 26–27 April – The 26th ASEAN Summit, Kuala Lumpur and Langkawi 2015:
  - The opening ceremony of the ASEAN Summit in Kuala Lumpur Convention Centre, Kuala Lumpur, Malaysia.
  - GOASEAN, the world's first ASEAN-focused travel channel, was launched at the 26th ASEAN Summit in Kuala Lumpur Convention Centre, Kuala Lumpur, Malaysia.
- 27 April – The Badminton World Federation (BWF) confirmed that the Malaysian badminton player, Lee Chong Wei has been banned for eight-months for failing a dope test at the World Championships in Copenhagen, Denmark last year. BWF stated that the ban is from 30 August 2014, to the end of this month and that the former world No 1 will be able to resume his career on 1 May.
- 28 April – The 2014 annual report of the Government Transformation Programme (GTP) and Economic Transformation Programme (ETP) are announced by the Prime Minister, Mohammad Najib Abdul Razak.
- 29 April – The implementation of the Goods and Services Tax (GST)
  - Prepaid mobile phone reloads will continue to be charged the 6% goods and services tax (GST) on the reload amount beginning 1 May.

=== May ===
- 1 May
  - Petrol and diesel pump prices remain unchanged, despite rising crude oil prices. Retail prices for RON95, RON97 and diesel for May 2015 remain at existing levels.
  - Thousands of protesters march down the Kuala Lumpur city centre in a rally against the Goods and Services Tax (GST). Police have arrested 20 individuals who took part in a massive rally against the GST.
- 2 May – A couple and their seven-month-old baby were killed in a tragic highway crash involving three vehicles at kilometre 6.2 of the Duta–Ulu Klang Expressway (DUKE) near Setapak, Kuala Lumpur. The racing of six Perodua Myvi was claimed caused of accident.
- 5 May – The Singapore terminus for the Kuala Lumpur–Singapore High Speed Rail linking Kuala Lumpur and Singapore will be sited at Jurong East.
- 5 May – 2015 Rompin by-election:
  - Barisan Nasional (BN) candidate, Datuk Hasan Arifin has won the Rompin parliament seat by-election with a majority of 8,895 votes beating PAS candidate Nazri Ahmad.
- 6 May
  - One of the Malaysian student, Nor Atikah Alias who was injured in the dorm fire in Moscow State University at Moscow, Russia has died.
  - Sultan Nazrin Muizuddin Shah ibni Almarhum Sultan Azlan Muhibuddin Shah Al-Maghfullah is installed as the 35th Sultan of Perak.
- 7 May – 2015 Permatang Pauh by-election:
  - Parti Keadilan Rakyat (PKR) candidate, Wan Azizah Wan Ismail wins this by-election with a majority of 8,857 votes beating Barisan Nasional, Parti Rakyat Malaysia (PRM) and Independent candidate.
- 8 May – The two Perodua Myvi drivers involved in an accident which killed a couple and their seven-month-old girl on the Duta–Ulu Klang Expressway have pleaded not guilty at a magistrate's court in Jalan Duta, Kuala Lumpur.
- 8 May – 2015 Pakistan Army Mil Mi-17 crash:
  - Datin Habibah Mahmud, wife of Malaysian ambassador to Pakistan Datuk Dr Hasrul Sani Mujtabar was killed in helicopter crash in Gilgit, Pakistan.
- 14 May
  - Two individuals are kidnapped by the Abu Sayyaf gunmen in Sandakan, Sabah.
  - Malaysia lost 3–1 to Korea at the 2015 Sudirman Cup Quarter-Finals in Dongguan, China, which saw the team crashed out of the tournament.
- 16 May –
  - The body of ill fate helicopter crash in Pakistan, Datin Habibah Mahmud has arrived at Kuala Lumpur International Airport (KLIA) by the Royal Malaysian Air Force (RMAF), C-130 Hercules. Later, her body was brought back to her hometown at Parit Yusuf in Muar, Johor and laid to rest at Parit Yusuf Muslim Cemetery.
  - Terengganu football fans turns riot at Sultan Mizan Zainal Abidin Stadium, Kuala Terengganu after their team were beaten to Singapore's LionsXII in the FA Cup semi final second leg.
- 18 May – Two men died while a nine-year-old girl was seriously injured after they were struck by lightning outside Sekolah Kebangsaan Seri Permatang Rengas in Parit Karjan, Sri Medan, Johor.
- 21 May – 2015 Rohingya refugee crisis:
  - Royal Malaysian Navy (RMN) sends four vessels to Langkawi, assist in Rohingya humanitarian mission.
- 23 May
  - Singapore's LionsXII, becomes the first non-Malaysian football club to win the FA Cup for the first time after beating Kelantan, 3–1 in the final at the National Stadium, Bukit Jalil.
  - Prime Minister, Mohammad Najib Abdul Razak made his three-day official visit to Japan and meets his counterpart Shinzo Abe.
- 24 May – Mass graves and suspected human-trafficking detention camps have been discovered by police in Wang Kelian, Perlis near Thailand border.
- 27 May – Dewan Rakyat had approved a motion to debate on the mass graves and death camps used by human trafficking syndicates found in Perlis.
- 30 May – The Royal FLORIA Putrajaya flower and garden festival is held in Putrajaya.

=== June ===
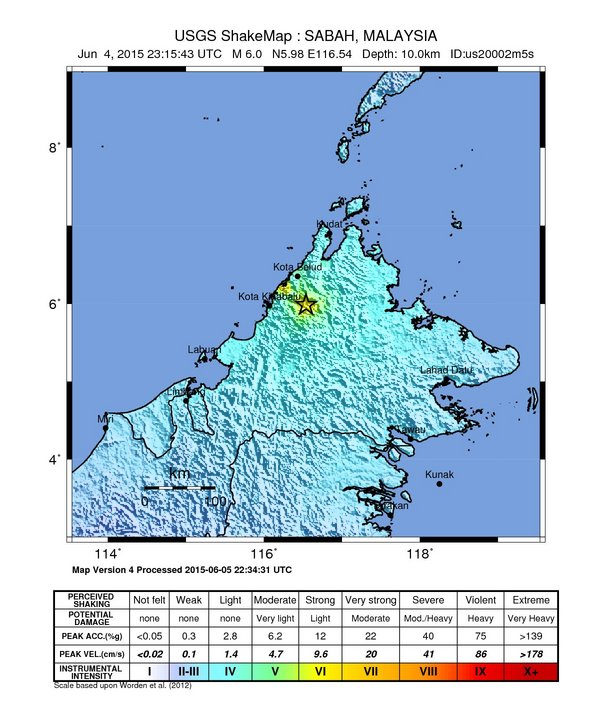
ShakeMap of the Sabah earthquake on 5 June from the United States Geological Survey.

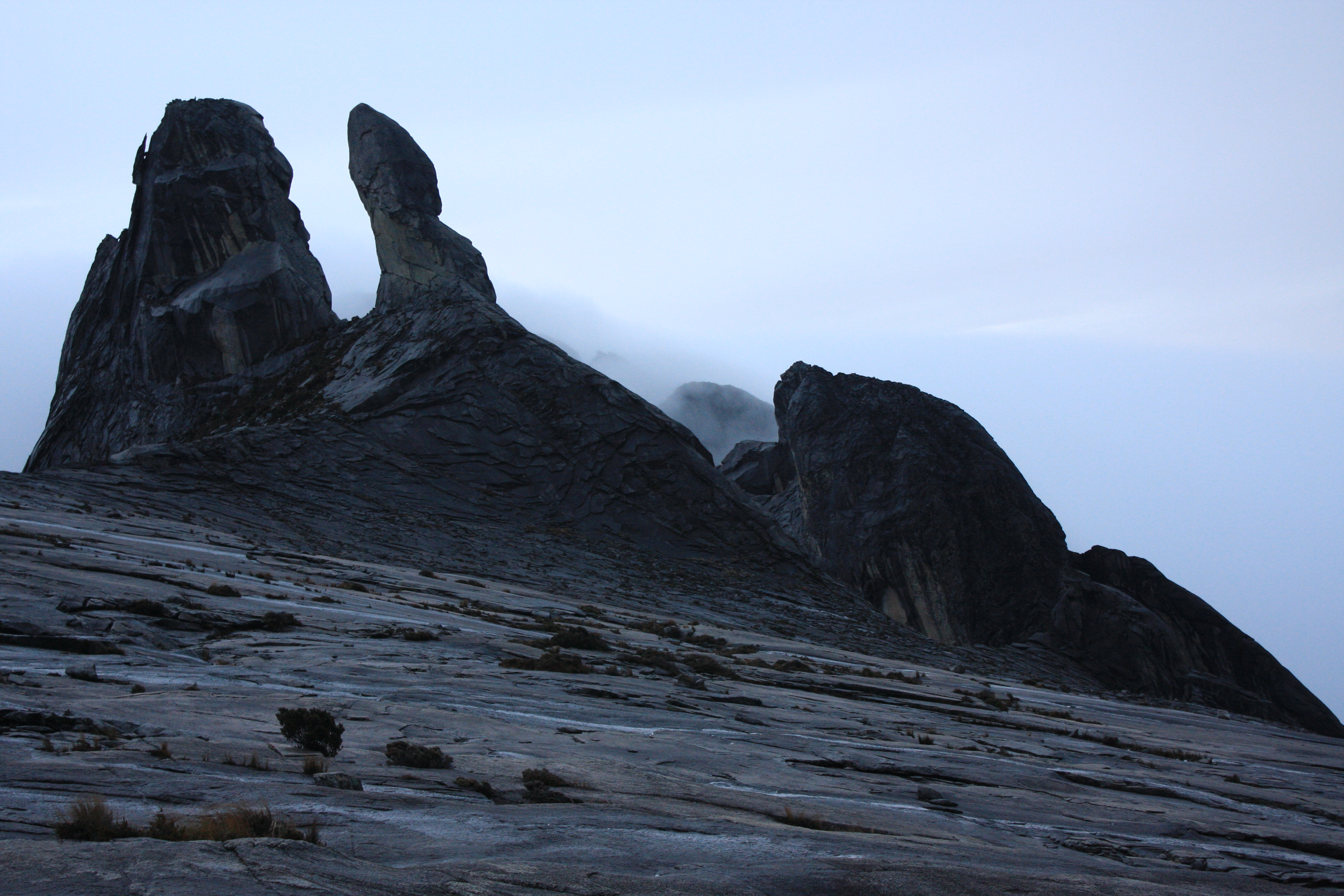
Donkey Ear's Peak, prior the Sabah earthquake damage which reduced the size of the prominences on 5 June.

- 1 June
  - The RON 95 petrol will be priced up at RM2.05 a litre (+10 sen), RON 97 petrol at RM2.35 a litre (+10 sen) and diesel at RM2.05 a litre (+10 sen).
  - Official opening of the first bus rapid transit in Malaysia, BRT Sunway Line by the Prime Minister, Mohammad Najib Abdul Razak.
  - Following the loss of Flights MH370 and MH17 on last year, Malaysia Airlines begins its massive restructuring with 6,000 job cuts. Christoph Mueller is appointed as chief executive officer of Malaysia Airlines.
- 4 June – Pan-Malaysian Islamic Party (PAS) president, Abdul Hadi Awang retained his post after defeating his challenger, veteran PAS leader Ahmad Awang, at the PAS party elections in Kuala Selangor, Selangor.
- 5 June – The 5.9 M_{w} Sabah earthquake struck Ranau, Sabah:
  - At least 145 people are trapped on top of the Mount Kinabalu following the quake and rescue operations to retrieve them are ongoing, according to Sabah Parks.
  - The iconic Donkey's Ear Peak at Mount Kinabalu has been destroyed due to the tremors.
  - Chief Minister of Sabah Musa Aman has declared an emergency holiday for the state and civil servants in Ranau area after 6.0 (5.9)-magnitude earthquake.
  - Malaysian Army troops and assets are on standby and are ready to be deployed to assist authorities in rescue operations following the 6.0 (5.9) magnitude earthquake in Ranau, Sabah.
  - At least two people were killed in the quake.
- 5–16 June – Malaysia at the 2015 SEA Games in Singapore.
- 6 June – The 2015 Sabah earthquake:
  - Nine more bodies were recovered by the search and rescue team on Mount Kinabalu.
  - Another earthquake was recorded at 1:45 pm with a magnitude of 4.5. Richter 25 km northwest of Ranau.
  - A third earthquake occurred with a magnitude of 2.7 Richter, recorded 11 km west of Tuaran district at 4:43 pm.
  - Police have confirm the numbers of death tolls from the Mount Kinabalu quake victims currently stands at 13 bodies.
- 7 June – Prime Minister, Mohammad Najib Abdul Razak made his three-day official visit to Saudi Arabia and meets his counterpart King Salman of Saudi Arabia.
- 7 June – The 2015 Sabah earthquake:
  - Police have confirm the numbers of death tolls from the Mount Kinabalu quake victims currently stands at 19 bodies. Most of victims were nine from Singapore, and six from Malaysia.
- 8 June – The 2015 Sabah earthquake:
  - State mourning day for the Sabah earthquake.
    - The state flag of Sabah is to be flown at half-mast and all entertainment activities are cancelled as a mark of respects for the earthquake victims.
- 9 June – The 2015 Sabah earthquake:
  - Prime Minister, Mohammad Najib Abdul Razak flew into Sabah to visit Ranau and Kundasang which are recovering from an earthquake on 5 June.
- 10 June – The 2015 Sabah earthquake:
  - Two more Singaporeans quake victims found on Mount Kinabalu, Ranau, Sabah.
- 12 June – Malaysia Airlines Flight MH148 made its emergency landing at Melbourne Airport in Melbourne, Australia after a starboard engine failure shortly after takeoff.
- 13 June – The 2015 Sabah earthquake:
  - A magnitude 5.2 on Richter scale hits Ranau.
- 13 June – T-Team imported football player from Nigeria, David Faramola Aniya died during a friendly match against Kelantan F.C..
- 14 June – Oil tanker, MT Orkim Harmony went missing at the east coast of Johor.
- 16 June – Opposition alliance, Pakatan Rakyat has formally declared disbanded after PAS cut ties with DAP.
- 16 June – Malaysia at the 2015 SEA Games in Singapore
  - Malaysia won 62 Gold medals at the 2015 SEA Games in Singapore. The nation will host the multi-sport event in 2017 SEA Games.
- 18 June
  - A newly built house that belongs to a school teacher was completely destroyed by a landslide at Kampung Mesilau, Kundasang, Sabah.
  - Oil tanker, MT Orkim Harmony that "disappeared" off the east coast of Johor on 14 June has been detected, repainted and renamed as Kim Harmon, in Cambodian waters, according to a statement by the Royal Malaysian Navy (RMN).
- 19 June – The hijacked oil tanker MT Orkim Harmony has been released by pirates, who fled in the ship's rescue boat. All 22 crew members of the oil tanker are safe and have been released by pirates at 2:30 am.
- 21 June – World no.1 badminton player, Lee Chong Wei wins US Open Badminton Championships.
- 22 June – 2015 Rohingya refugee crisis:
  - The bodies of 21 human trafficking victims believed to be Rohingya refugees found in Wang Kelian, Perlis last month were buried at the Kampung Tualang cemetery in Pokok Sena, Kedah.
- 22 June – Three workers were killed and six others were injured in a Mydin shopping mall under construction at Pulau Sebang, Malacca collapsed.
- 23 June – The 2015 Sabah earthquake:
  - 19 people were killed by earthquake on mount kinabalu.
- 26 June – UMNO president, Mohammad Najib Abdul Razak announced that the party elections, scheduled for next year, will be postponed by 18 months to strengthen the Barisan Nasional ahead of the 14th general election.
- 27 June – Malaysia under 13 football team wins the Ibercup Costa del Sol competition after beating Portugal's Sporting CP 2–1 in the final.

=== July ===
- 1 July – The RON 95 petrol will be priced up at RM2.15 a litre (+10 sen) and RON 97 petrol at RM2.55 a litre (+20 sen).
- 2 July
  - The Wall Street Journal (WSJ) reported that Malaysian investigators have traced nearly US$700 million of deposits into what they believe are personal bank accounts of Prime Minister Mohammad Najib Abdul Razak.
  - Chief Minister of Penang, Lim Guan Eng declares that the Penang are no longer Pakatan Rakyat state government, but will now be known as the 'Penang' state government.
- 5 July – MYTV, Malaysia's first digital terrestrial television (DTT) is launched.
- 8 July – Police raided the 1Malaysia Development Berhad (1MDB) office in Kuala Lumpur, as a task force expands its investigations into the government-owned strategic investor saddled with a RM42 billion debt.
- 9 July
  - The Public Accounts Committee (PAC) has received the interim report on the initial findings of 1Malaysia Development Berhad (1MDB) from the Auditor-General (A-G), Ambrin Buang.
  - Proton cars celebrates its 30th anniversary.
- 10 July – Opening of the Electric Train Service (ETS) of the Ipoh–Padang Besar line.
- 11 July – The first anniversary of the Malaysia Airlines Flight MH17 crash:
  - The Malaysia Airlines Flight MH17 memorial service is held at Bunga Raya Complex of the Kuala Lumpur International Airport (KLIA).
- 11 July – Seven men trashed an Oppo store at Low Yat Plaza in Bukit Bintang, Kuala Lumpur on night in a row over a mobile phone, causing an estimated RM70,000 in damage.
- 13 July – Five people were injured in a mob attack near Low Yat Plaza in Bukit Bintang, Kuala Lumpur early morning, following a brawl that broke out at the shopping mall on 11 July.
- 14 July
  - A 22-year-old unemployed youth was charged at the Magistrate's Court for stealing a Lenovo handphone worth RM800 from an outlet at the Low Yat Plaza in Bukit Bintang, Kuala Lumpur.
  - Police arrested Armed Forces Veterans Association President, Mohd Ali Baharom known as "Ali Tinju" for allegedly making a racially charged speech prior to 13 July bloody riots in front of Low Yat Plaza in Bukit Bintang, Kuala Lumpur.
  - Police arrested Wan Muhammad Azri Wan Deris, better known as blogger Papagomo at his home under the Sedition Act in connection with 13 July Low Yat Plaza brawl.
- 16 July – Five people are confirmed dead while another two people who went missing after their boat capsized two nautical miles off Tanjung Karang, Selangor.
- 17 July – The first anniversary of the Malaysia Airlines Flight MH17 crash:
  - The first anniversary of the Malaysia Airlines Flight MH17 crash in conjunction with the during Hari Raya Aidilfitri celebration.
- 20 July – Access to the Sarawak Report website has been blocked by the Malaysian Communications and Multimedia Commission (MCMC) on grounds that it may undermine the stability of the country.
- 21 July – A managing director has been remanded for five days to assist with investigations into the 1Malaysia Development Berhad (1MDB) scandal.
- 22 July
  - Sarawak celebrates its 52nd anniversary of independence from British colonial rule in 1963.
  - Services on the RapidKL's Kelana Jaya light rail transit (LRT) line were severely disrupted by two incidents. The first took place in the morning at 8:19 am when faulty brakes on a train at the Setiawangsa LRT station stopped services for about an hour, causing many users to arrive late for work. The line finally resumed operating at around 9:45 am. The second occurred later at 12:18 pm near the Universiti LRT station, and reportedly also involved a faulty brake system. This time however, the implications of the problem were far more serious – the affected train caught fire, forcing the Kelana Jaya Line to halt line operations.
- 23 July – The Land Public Transport Commission (SPAD) will set up a special committee to investigate the brake failure incidents on the Kelana Jaya LRT at two separate location on 22 July.
- 27 July – Former Federal Court judge, Mohamed Apandi Ali was appointed as Attorney General effective 28 July replacing Abdul Gani Patail.
- 28 July – Malaysian Cabinet Reshuffle 2015:
  - Ahmad Zahid Hamidi is appointed as Deputy Prime Minister and Home Minister effective 29 July replacing Muhyiddin Yassin. All seven new ministers and nine deputy prime ministers were appointed.
- 28 July – An article published by Time magazine suggests US President Barack Obama should steer clear from the Malaysian Prime Minister Mohammad Najib Abdul Razak. Topping the five-item list of reasons for Obama to do so is the 1MDB scandal.
- 29 July
  - Opening of the Mitsui Outlet Park at Kuala Lumpur International Airport (KLIA) in Sepang, Selangor.
  - Two floors of Menara 2 building of the Royal Malaysian Police headquarters in Bukit Aman, Kuala Lumpur caught fire at evening. No injuries reported.
  - Malaysia will not signed the Trans Pacific Partnership Agreement (TPPA) in Hawaii.
- 29 July – The first anniversary of the Malaysia Airlines Flight MH17 crash:
  - Malaysia will seek the support of United Nations Security Council (UNSC) members to establish an international criminal tribunal over the downing of Malaysia Airlines Flight MH17 last year.
- 29 July – The first anniversary of the Malaysia Airlines Flight MH370 crash:
  - Aircraft debris almost certainly Boeing 777-2H6ER believed to be Malaysia Airlines MH370 was found on La Reunion island, a French overseas department off the east coast of Africa.
  - Malaysia has sent a team to La Reunion island, a French overseas department off the east coast of Africa to determine whether washed-up debris may be from the missing Malaysia Airlines Flight MH370 that is believed to have crashed in the Indian Ocean last year.
  - The Boeing 777-2H6ER plane debris will be shipped to Toulouse, France for analysis and investigation under the BEA.
- 30 July–3 August – The 128th IOC Session is held at Kuala Lumpur Convention Centre, Kuala Lumpur. On 31 July, Beijing, China is selected by the IOC as host city of the 2022 Winter Olympics and Lausanne, Switzerland as host city of the 2020 Winter Youth Olympics.
- 30 July – The first anniversary of the Malaysia Airlines Flight MH17 crash:
  - Malaysia is deeply disappointed by the failure of the United Nations Security Council (UNSC) to adopt the draft resolution for the establishment of an ad hoc international criminal tribunal to try those responsible for the downing of Malaysia Airlines flight MH17.
- 31 July – The first anniversary of the Malaysia Airlines Flight MH370 crash:
  - A part number on a piece of aircraft wreckage found in the Indian Ocean confirms the object is from a Boeing 777-2H6ER.

=== August ===
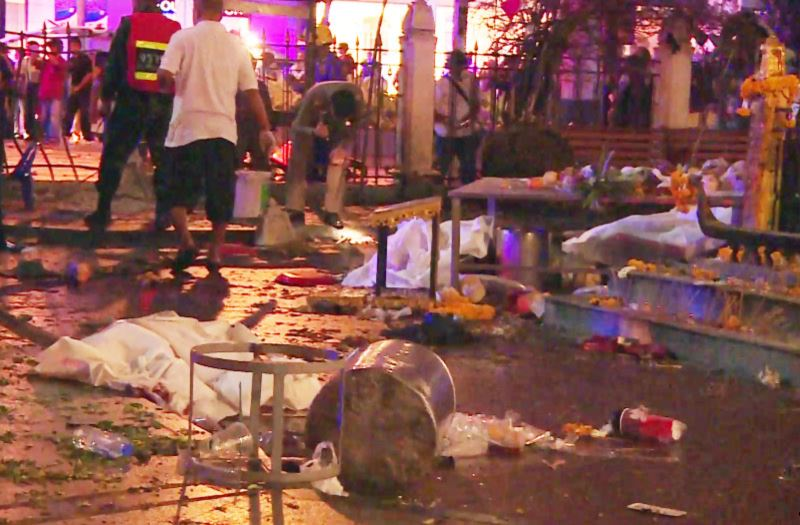
Bombing at Ratchaprasong in Bangkok, Thailand on 17 August.

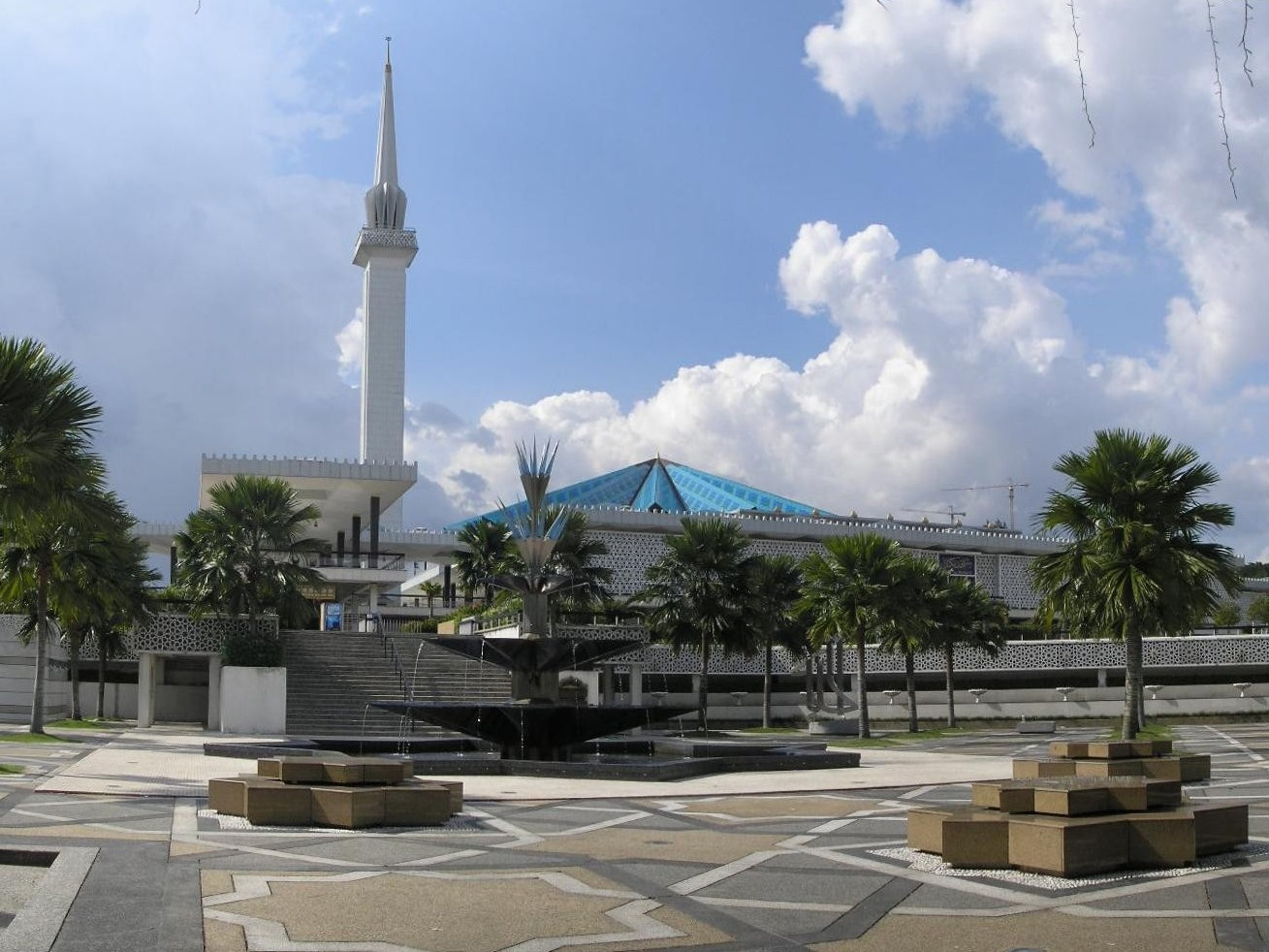
Masjid Negara, the National Mosque of Malaysia celebrates its golden jubilee (50th anniversary).

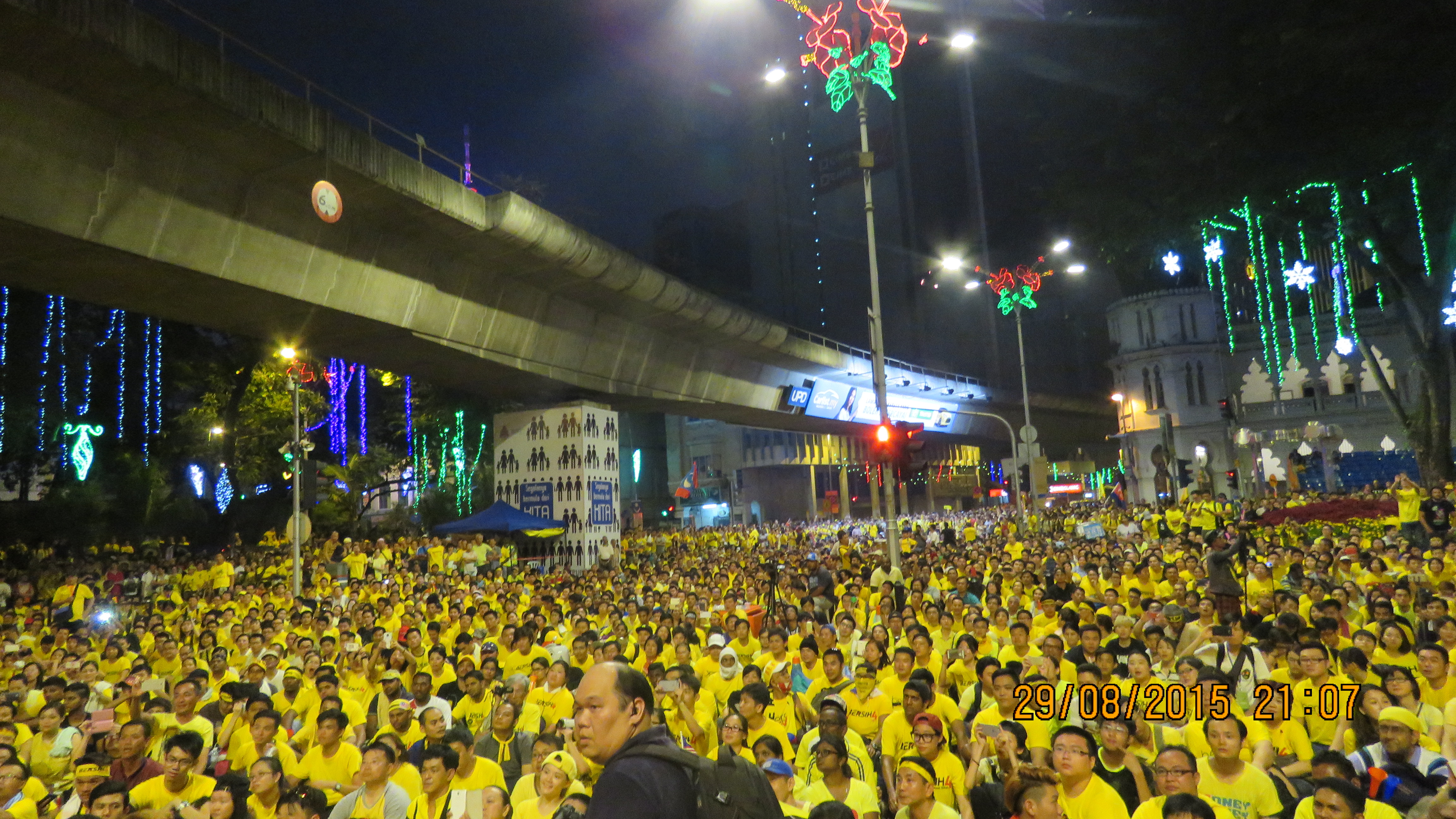
More than 10,000 people took over major roads in Kuala Lumpur kicking off a weekend of Bersih 4.0 rally rallies.

- 1 August
  - Retail prices of RON95, RON97 and diesel reduced 10 sen a litre each, effective midnight.
  - Police arrested 29 people over a protest rally, "Tangkap Najib Rally" organised by a group calling itself Demi Malaysia in front of the Sogo shopping centre, Kuala Lumpur including Teja assemblyman Chang Lih Kang and Simpang Pulai assemblyman Tan Kar Hing.
  - Kuching, capital city of Sarawak has declared as the 'City of Unity'.
- 1 August – The first anniversary of the Malaysia Airlines Flight MH370 crash:
  - Suspected MH370 debris arrives in Toulouse, France for inspection.
- 2 August – New Straits Times celebrates its 170th anniversary.
- 2 August – The first anniversary of the Malaysia Airlines Flight MH370 crash:
  - Possible aircraft door of Boeing 777-2H6ER discovered on Réunion Island, France.
- 3 August – The Malaysian Anti-Corruption Commission (MACC) said funds amounting to RM2.6 billion supposedly deposited into Prime Minister Mohammad Najib Abdul Razak's personal account, were campaign donations and not funds from state investment company, 1Malaysia Development Berhad (1MDB).
- 6 August – The first anniversary of the Malaysia Airlines Flight MH370 crash:
  - Prime Minister, Mohammad Najib Abdul Razak announced that structural debris found washed ashore on Réunion Island is confirmed to be from missing Malaysia Airlines Flight MH370.
- 7 August – The first anniversary of the Malaysia Airlines Flight MH370 crash:
  - France has launched a renewed air and sea search around the Indian Ocean island of Réunion Island in the hope of finding more debris from the missing Malaysia Airlines flight MH370.
- 7–9 August – Kuala Lumpur City Grand Prix is held in Kuala Lumpur.
- 9 August – Singapore-registered tanker MT Joaquim which went missing in Selangor waters on 8 August has been found some 14 nautical miles east of off Rupat Island, Indonesia. However, the cargo of 3,500 metric tonnes of marine fuel oil were missing.
- 11 August – The first anniversary of the Malaysia Airlines Flight MH370 crash:
  - Malaysia sends a team of experts to the Maldives to investigate reports that debris from the missing Flight MH370 has washed up there.
- 14 August – Governor-General of Australia, Peter Cosgrove made his five-day official visit to Malaysia and meet his counterpart, Mohammad Najib Abdul Razak.
- 14 August – The first anniversary of the Malaysia Airlines Flight MH370 crash:
  - A Malaysian team inspecting debris that washed up in the Maldives has so far found nothing that came from missing flight MH370.
- 15 August – Doa untuk Malaysia (Pray for Malaysia) programme is held at Merdeka Square, Kuala Lumpur.
- 17 August – 2015 Bangkok bombing:
  - Five Malaysians have been confirmed to be among at least 23 people killed in a bomb blast at Ratchaprasong district, in central Bangkok, Thailand which also injured dozens others.
- 19 August – The entire 41.5 km elevated guideway for the MRT Sungai Buloh–Kajang Line has now been completed.
- 27 August – Masjid Negara, the National Mosque of Malaysia celebrates its golden jubilee (50th anniversary).
- 29 August – The Bersih 4.0 rally (Day 1):
  - The Bersih 4.0 rally are held in major cities nationwide, namely Kuala Lumpur, Kota Kinabalu and Kuching.
    - In Kuala Lumpur, more than 10,000 people took over major roads in the city kicking off a weekend of Bersih 4.0 rallies.
    - In Kuching, nearly 10,000 people thronged the Song Kheng Khai field for the Bersih 4.0 Kuching event at evening.
    - In Kota Kinabalu, some 500 people from the Sabah Trade Centre, 50 from the Hakka Association Hall, and 100 from the City mosque and Plaza Juta walked in small groups chanting "Bersih, Bersih" repeatedly, towards the Tanjung Lipat waterfront in city centre.
  - The Malaysian Communication of Multimedia Commission (MCMC) has decided to block websites which promote, disseminate information and encourage people to join the Bersih 4.0 rally. The commission said that these actions could undermine the country's stability.
  - Former Prime Minister, Mahathir Mohamad made a surprise appearance at the Bersih 4.0 rally when he arrived at Merdeka Square, Kuala Lumpur.
- 30 August – The Bersih 4.0 rally (Day 2):
  - Former Prime Minister, Mahathir Mohamad arrived at the Bersih 4.0 rally for the second time, getting down near Central Market.
  - Bersih 4.0 organisers, participants who violate the law to face legal actions, Deputy Prime Minister, Ahmad Zahid Hamidi said.
  - Melaka police have arrested 12 individuals in the state for wearing yellow T-shirt with the printed words 'Bersih 4.0' which is prohibited under the Printing Presses and Publications (Control of Undesirable Publications) (No. 22) Order 2015).
  - Prime Minister Mohammad Najib Abdul Razak said the organisers of the Bersih 4.0 rally do not care about the people's welfare, nor do they care about developing the rural areas.
  - City Police Chief, Tajudin Md Isa said a total of 27 police reports were lodged throughout the two-day rally.
  - At 12:00 am, 31 August. The crowd sings Negaraku to conclude the rally. The 34 hours Bersih 4.0 officially comes to an end with the Chairperson Maria Chin Abdullah leading the countdown to Merdeka.

=== September ===
- 1 September – Retail prices of RON95, RON97 and diesel reduced 10 sen a litre each, effective midnight. The price of RON 95 and RON 97 are reduced by 10 sen to RM1.95 and RM2.35 per litre respectively and the price of diesel is drop from RM1.95 to RM1.80.
- 3 September
  - Former Prime Minister, Mahathir Mohamad to be investigated for criminal defamation over statements he made during Bersih 4.0 rally, Inspector General of Police, Khalid Abu Bakar said.
  - At least three people were injured in an accident involving a car, a van and three motorcycles in Jalan Kuching, Kuala Lumpur causing a massive traffic jam in the morning.
  - More than 40 people are missing after a boat ferrying illegal immigrants on their way home to Indonesia capsized off Sabak Bernam, Selangor.
  - Malaysia football team suffer their biggest ever defeat as United Arab Emirates (UAE) beat them 10–0 in a 2018 FIFA World Cup qualification in Abu Dhabi. On 4 September, national football coach, Dollah Salleh resigned.
- 5–11 September – Malaysia at the 2015 Commonwealth Youth Games in Apia, Samoa.
- 7 September – A traffic enforcement officer, Inspector Margaret Tagum anak Goen succumbed to her injuries after she was run over by a Mat Rempit during 'Ops Roda/Rempit' at Km 58, Jalan Batu Pahat–Mersing in Kluang, Johor early morning.
- 11 September – A crane collapses at the Al-Haram Mosque in Mecca, Saudi Arabia, killing 107 people and injuring 238 people including ten of Malaysian hajj pilgrimage. On 14 September, Tabung Haji confirmed that six Malaysian hajj pilgrimage were killed in the crane disaster.
- 13 September – 2015 Southeast Asian haze:
  - Residents with asthma and pulmonary problems were told to stay indoors until the air quality in their areas improved. Malaysia's aviation and maritime sectors were put on high alert following a worsening in view of the reduced visibility caused by the haze.
- 14 September – Penang Bridge celebrates its 30th anniversary.
- 14 September – 2015 Southeast Asian haze:
  - Unhealthy Air Pollution Index (API) readings were recorded in 24 areas in the states of Sarawak, with Selangor and Langkawi in Kedah being the worst hit by the haze.
  - The education ministry stated all schools had to close if the API readings surpassed 200. As a result, on 15 September, schools in the four states of Sarawak, Selangor, Negeri Sembilan and Malacca together with the Federal Territories of Kuala Lumpur and Putrajaya were ordered to close temporarily.
- 16 September – Police confirmed that missing deputy public prosecutor, Anthony Kevin Morais was murdered after human remains were found in a concrete-filled drum in USJ1, Subang Jaya, Selangor 12 days after he went missing.
- 16 September – The 2015 United People's rally:
  - More than 200,000 people are attending in a United People's rally or "Red Shirt" rally in the city centre of Kuala Lumpur, in support of the Mohammad Najib Abdul Razak's government.
  - Police fired water cannons at protesters demanding to be let into Petaling Street where Chinatown is located during a rally in support of the government.
- 18 September
  - Unidentify foreign man was slapped second imam of Masjid Negara (National Mosque), Mohd Zuhairee Bin Mohd Yatim in midway of friday prayer. That man was detained after that.
  - Former UMNO member Khairuddin Abu Hassan is arrested by police on suspicion of having committed activity detrimental to parliamentary democracy, an offence under the Penal Code.
- 19 September – Silat is declared as a national martial arts of Malaysia.
- 21 September – Tunku Raudzah binti Almarhum Sultan Sir Hishamuddin Alam Shah, Raja Puan Muda of Kedah and also consort of Tengku Abdul Malik ibni Almarhum Sultan Badlishah, Raja Muda of Kedah died at the age of 86 at the Sultanah Bahiyah Hospital (HSB) in Alor Setar due to ill health. Her body was laid to rest at Kedah Royal Mausoleum in Langgar, Kedah. Kedah declared seven days of mourning begins 21 until 27 of September.
- 22 September – Opposition political alliance, Pakatan Harapan (Coalition of Hope) was formed, consisting of the Democratic Action Party (DAP), People's Justice Party (PKR) and National Trust Party (PAN).
- 24 September – A stampede during the Hajj pilgrimage in Mina near Mecca, Saudi Arabia, kills more than 700 people and injures at least 800 others. One Malaysian hajj pilgrims was killed in a stampede.
- 26 September – The leader who make United People's rally or "Red Shirt" rally in the city centre of Kuala Lumpur, Jamal Mohd Yunus was detain by police in relation to his remarks of an alleged rioting during a rally in Petaling Street. He was released after that.
- 28 September – Royal Australian Navy's submarine, HMAS Sheean makes surprise appearance in Penang.
- 30 September – Indian national Shabir Ahmad Khan from Kashmir was ordered by the Magistrate Court to undergo mental evaluation at Hospital Bahagia in Tanjung Rambutan, Perak for allegedly slapping a Masjid Negara (National Mosque) second imam, Mohd Zuhairee Bin Mohd Yatim during Friday prayers on 18 September.

=== October ===
- 1 October
  - Retail prices of RON95, RON97 and diesel increased 10 sen a litre each, effective midnight. The price of RON 95 and RON 97 are increased by 10 sen to RM2.05 and RM2.45 per litre respectively and the price of diesel is up to RM1.90.
  - The Vehicle Entry Permit (VEP) has now been implemented at Johor Causeway and Malaysia–Singapore Second Crossing.
- 3 October – 2015 Southeast Asian haze:
  - The officials decided to cancel the Standard Chartered KL Marathon 2015 due to the worsening haze.
- 4 October – 2015 Southeast Asian haze:
  - As haze reached unhealthy levels in many parts of the country, the government announced that all states except for Kelantan, Sabah and Sarawak were to close schools again for two days.
  - The API in Shah Alam, Selangor even hit the hazardous level of 308.
- 5 October – The Football Association of Malaysia (FAM) have been fined CHF 40,000 (RM 180,000) by FIFA and ordered to play in an own empty stadium following crowd trouble in the 2018 FIFA World Cup Group A qualifying match against Saudi Arabia (Saudi Arabia won 3–0) at the Shah Alam Stadium on 8 September.
- 9 October
  - Former Alor Limbat, Terengganu's state assemblyman, Alias Abdullah, was gunned down at his home in Marang after Friday prayers.
  - Two Orang Asli school girls from Sekolah Kebangsaan (SK) Tohoi in Gua Musang, Kelantan who went missing since 23 August were found safe but in a weak condition in Sungai Emas.
- 10 October – Hari Sukan Negara (National Sports Day) is held nationwide for the first time.
- 13 October – The first anniversary of the Malaysia Airlines Flight MH17 crash:
  - Dutch authorities have officially confirmed that crashed Malaysia Airlines flight MH17 was shootdown by a Russian-made Buk missile fired from eastern Ukraine, killing all 298 people on board.
- 14 October – The OKU disabled teenager, Muhammad Firdaus Dullah, who was found neglected and extremely malnourished at a unit of Taman Semarak Flats in Nilai, Negeri Sembilan last year, has died. He was 16 years old.
- 14 October – Six family members were killed when their car skidded and collided with a trailer parked on the emergency lane at KM 258.8 of the East Coast Expressway Phase 2 near the Perasing rest and service area in Kemaman, Terengganu.
- 14 October – The first anniversary of the Malaysia Airlines Flight MH17 crash:
  - Russia has appealed to the International Civil Aviation Organization (ICAO) to open a new probe into last year's downing of Malaysia Airlines Flight MH17 over eastern Ukraine.
- 19 October – 2015 Southeast Asian haze:
  - Flights were also delayed and cancelled in the east coast of Sabah due to continuous haze from Kalimantan.
- 20 October – 2015 Southeast Asian haze:
  - Around 1,909,842 students from 3,029 schools in Malaysia were affected, which increased to 2,696,110 students and 4,778 schools by 22 October.
  - It was a concern in the week leading up to the 2015 Malaysian motorcycle Grand Prix as the event could have come under threat of haze.
- 23 October – The 2016 Federal Budget highlights
  - 2016 budget allocates total RM267.2 billion, an increase from a revised allocation of 260.7 billion for 2015. The initial allocation for 2015 was 273.9 billion.
  - For 2016, federal government revenue collection is projected at RM225.7 billion, up RM3.2 billion from 2015.
  - RM41.3 billion allocated to improve education.
  - Defence Ministry allocated RM17.1 billion.
  - Allocation of RM30.1 billion for development projects, RM5.2 billion for security, social development gets RM13.1 billion.
  - Government allocates RM1.2 billion to the tourism industry.
  - Majlis Amanah Rakyat (MARA), an agency to facilitate the development of ethnic Malays and other indigenous Malaysians, allocated RM3.7 billion.
  - Affordable housing projects allocated RM1.6 billion, to be spent building 175,000 houses.
  - RM900 million allocated to resolve Kuala Lumpur traffic congestion.
  - Telecommunications infrastructure allocated RM1.2 billion.
  - RM1.4 billion earmarked for development of rural roads nationwide. The Pan Borneo Highway to be toll free.
  - Government to improve infrastructure in rural areas, including building houses and water supply.
  - RM5.3 billion allocated to modernize agricultural sector.
  - RM515 million allocated to improve electricity supply in Sabah state.
  - Pengerang oil project to receive RM18 billion in 2016.
  - Increased from RM900 per month to RM1,000 in peninsular Malaysia.
  - Current account surplus in 2016 to be down more than half to RM11.3 billion from RM23.4 billion this year and RM47.3 billion in 2014.
  - Economic growth forecasts at 4.0–5.0 percent for 2016, compared with 4.5–5.0 percent this year.
  - Fiscal deficit for 2016 reduced to 3.1 percent of gross domestic product, down from 3.2 percent in 2015 and 3.4 percent last year.
  - Exports forecast to rebound 1.4 percent in 2016 after a 0.7 percent fall this year.
  - Inflation seen at 2.0–3.0 percent in 2016, against 2.0–2.5 percent this year.
  - Government debt limit to remain at 55 percent of GDP in 2016, forecasting a ratio of 54.0 percent this year and slightly up from 52.7 percent in 2014.
  - Oil and gas related revenues seen at 14.1 percent of total revenue in 2016, down from 19.7 percent in 2015.
  - Goods and Services Tax (GST) expected to raise 39 billion next year, against RM27 billion collected in the first eight months of 2015.
  - Subsidy allocations seen falling slightly to RM26.1 billion from RM26.2 billion this year.
- 23–25 October – The Malaysian motorcycle Grand Prix celebrates its 25th anniversary.
- 27 October - Prime Minister Mohammad Najib Abdul Razak has filed a suit against former MCA President Ling Liong Sik for allegedly defaming him.
- 30 October – An Indian national, Shabir Ahmad Khan who slapped the second imam of Masjid Negara (National Mosque) during Friday prayers last month was fined RM12,000 or three months' jail by the Magistrate's Court.
- 31 October
  - Official opening of the Rapid KL LRT's Sri Petaling Line extension phase 1 from Seri Petaling to Kinrara BK5.
  - Johor Darul Ta'zim FC (JDT), the only football club from Malaysia wins the 2015 AFC Cup for the first time after beating FC Istiklol of Tajikistan 1–0 in the final at Dushanbe. Johor state government declared public holiday on 1 November following the JDT's victory.

=== November ===
- 2 November – The Anti Smuggling Unit (UPP) changed its names into Malaysian Border Security Agency (AKSEM)
- 3 November – A family of four have been arrested for their suspected involvement in the gruesome murders of at least six people in Tapah, Perak.
- 4 November – Tunku Hamidah binti Almarhum Sultan Badlishah, sister of the 5th and 14th Yang di-Pertuan Agong, Sultan Abdul Halim Mu'adzam Shah of Kedah died at the age of 90. Her body was laid to rest at Kedah Royal Mausoleum in Langgar, Kedah.
- 6 November – The Health Ministry has started a nationwide crackdown by raiding vape stores and confiscating thousands bottles of vape liquid that contain nicotine.
- 11 November – A landslide has occurred at Km 52.4 of the Kuala Lumpur–Karak Expressway between Lentang and Bukit Tinggi, Pahang and Gombak–Bentong old roads due to heavy rains. The Lentang–Bukit Tinggi stretch of the expressway was closed to traffic. On 15 November, the stretches of the expressway was reopened to traffic.
- 13 November – November 2015 Paris attacks:
  - At least 129 people are killed in a series of coordinated terrorist attacks in Paris, France. Prime Minister, Mohammad Najib Abdul Razak expressed his shock about the attack, and condemns the "outrageous attacks in Paris on innocent civilians". Wisma Putra confirms that there are no Malaysians have been reported dead in the Paris attacks.
- 15 November – Malaysian no.1 badminton player, Lee Chong Wei wins China Open after beating Chen Long of China, 21–15, 21–11 in the final.
- 16 November
  - Several parts of Shah Alam, Selangor and Johor Bahru, Johor were hit by flash floods.
  - One people injured in a Piper PA28-161 aircraft crashed lands into a ditch at the golf club near Senai International Airport in Senai, Johor.
- 18 November – Sarawak has adopted English as the official language of the state administration, apart from Bahasa Malaysia.
- 18–22 November – The 27th ASEAN and Related Summits, Kuala Lumpur, Malaysia:
  - 3:30 pm: US President, Barack Obama arrived in Kuala Lumpur from Manila, Philippines for three-day visit and attending the 27th ASEAN and Related Summits.
  - 4:00 pm: US President, Barack Obama attend a town hall session with ASEAN Youth as part of the Young Southeast Asian Leaders Initiative (YSALI) at Taylor's University lakeside campus in Subang Jaya, Selangor.
  - 8:00 pm: US President, Barack Obama meets Prime Minister, Mohammad Najib Abdul Razak at the 2015 ASEAN Business and Investment Summit at the Shangri-La Hotel, Kuala Lumpur.
- 21 November – The 27th ASEAN and Related Summits, Kuala Lumpur, Malaysia (Day 2):
  - 10:30 am – US President Barack Obama visits the Dignity for Children Foundation, an educational institution for refugee and urban poor children in Sentul, Kuala Lumpur, Malaysia.
  - 11:00 am – The 27th ASEAN Summit and Related Summits kicked off with a strong condemnation of terrorism and extremism and a rousing call for the ASEAN Community to take its place on the world stage.
- 22 November – Malaysian badminton player Lee Chong Wei wins Hong Kong Open after beating Tian Houwei of China 21–16, 21–15 in the final.
- 22 November – The 27th ASEAN and Related Summits, Kuala Lumpur, Malaysia (Day 3):
  - 11:00 am – US President, Barack Obama announced plans to host the leaders of 10 ASEAN nations in 2016.
  - 5:30 pm – US President, Barack Obama concluded his three-day visit to Malaysia for the 27th ASEAN Summit and Related Summit. The Air Force One departed from Subang at 5:20 pm.
- 23 November – Indian Prime Minister, Narendra Modi and Chinese Premier, Li Keqiang made their official visit to Malaysia and meets the counterpart Mohammad Najib Abdul Razak in Putrajaya, Malaysia.
  - 12:30 pm – Indian Prime Minister, Narendra Modi and Prime Minister Mohammad Najib Abdul Razak jointly inaugurated the Torana Gate at Little India, Brickfields, Kuala Lumpur, Malaysia.
  - 3:30 pm – Malaysia and China sealed eight government-to-government memorandums of understanding (MoUs) and agreements in various fields including trade, culture and administration. The signing ceremony was witnessed by the Prime Minister Mohammad Najib Abdul Razak and Chinese Premier Li Keqiang at Perdana Putra, Putrajaya, Malaysia.
- 24 November – UMNO Wanita Gopeng chief Hamidah Osman is sacked from UMNO for disciplinary reasons.
- 26 November – The Sabah legislative assembly voted in favour of a motion to ban Parti Keadilan Rakyat (PKR) vice-presidents Nurul Izzah Anwar and Chua Tian Chang (Tian Chua) from entering the state following their controversial meeting earlier this month on 9 November with Sulu "princess" Jacel Kiram, a daughter of self-styled Sulu "sultan" Jamalul Kiram III, who is said to be the mastermind behind the Lahad Datu invasion two years ago.
- 27 November – Deputy Prime Minister, Ahmad Zahid Hamidi and the late deputy public prosecutor, Anthony Kevin Morais received the Perak award from the 35th Sultan of Perak, Sultan Nazrin Muizzuddin Shah.
- 28 November – Sultan of Johor, Sultan Ibrahim bans vape in the state and ordered all vape store closed starting 1 January 2016.
- 29 November – Tunku Abdul Malik ibni Almarhum Sultan Badlishah, Raja Muda of Kedah died at the age of 86. His body was laid to rest at Kedah Royal Mausoleum in Langgar, Kedah. Kedah declares three days of mourning.

=== December ===
- 1 December – The price of RON95 petrol decreased by 10 sen from RM2.05 to RM1.95. Price of RON97 petrol and diesel remain unchanged.
- 1 December – The first anniversary of the Indonesia AirAsia Flight QZ8501 crash:
  - Faulty equipment and the crew's "inability to control the aircraft" led an AirAsia Airbus A320-216 to crash into the Java Sea last year, killing all 162 people on board.
- 3 December – The National Security Council Bill 2015 has been passed by the Dewan Rakyat.
- 3–9 December – Malaysia at the 2015 ASEAN Para Games in Singapore:
- 4 December – A Malaysian businessman was shot dead by an unidentified gunman at noon while he was on his way from Sadao to the Hat Yai International Airport in Songkhla, Thailand.
- 5 December – Tunku Abdul Jalil, Tunku Laksamana Johor and also fourth son of the current Sultan Ibrahim of Johor died at the age of 25 due to cancer. His body was laid to rest at the Mahmoodiah Royal Mausoleum, Johor Bahru, Johor. Johor declares three days of mourning for public and seven days for royal family.
- 6 December – Parti Keadilan Rakyat (PKR) vice president Nurul Izzah Anwar, who was scheduled to announce the party's Sarawak election candidates for the state general election, has been barred from entering the state.
- 8 December – Prime Minister Mohammad Najib Abdul Razak has stressed that the donation of RM2.6 billion deposited into his account is neither from a public fund nor the government's strategic investment company, 1MDB.
- 9 December – Malaysia at the 2015 ASEAN Para Games in Singapore:
  - Malaysia won 52 Gold medals at the 2015 ASEAN Para Games in Singapore. The nation will host the multi-sport event in 2017 ASEAN Para Games.
- 10 December – The son of Federal Court Judge, Abdul Hamid Embong, Darem Hakimi, 27, died after he was involved in a car accident at Jalan Tuanku Abdul Halim, near the Parliament building, Kuala Lumpur.
- 11 December – The Chinese company, China Railway Construction Corporation (CRCC) has been awarded to build the Gemas–Johor Bahru Electrified Double Tracking Project (EDTP) which construction will begin in March 2016.
- 12 December – Selangor football team wins 33rd Malaysia Cup after beating Kedah 2–0 in the final at Shah Alam Stadium. Selangor declares public holiday on 14 December following the state club victory.
- 15 December – Malaysia among 34-state Islamic Military Alliance sponsored by Saudi Arabia against terrorism.
- 16 December – A former Fardu Ain and Religious Class (Kafa) teacher, Muhamad Faizal Mahmud Affandi pleaded guilty to punching a salesman Chea Wei Jian in the face at Plaza Low Yat, Kuala Lumpur on 12 November.
- 17 December – Britain's largest halal fast food chain, Chicken Cottage, opened the first outlet in Kuala Terengganu, Terengganu.
- 19 December – Five of the family were drowned in Belukar Bukit Waterfall in Kuala Berang, Terengganu.
- 20 December
  - Malaysia's first Sharia-Compliant budget airline Rayani Air begins its maiden flight.
  - Silat display at wedding turns bloody after man is stabbed to death with keris in Kampung Patau-Patau, Labuan.
  - A brawl has reportedly broken out at a mobile phone shop in the Kota Raya shopping complex in Kuala Lumpur, leaving two with minor injuries.
  - Thirteen Malaysian tourist mostly from Batu Pahat, Johor were killed in a bus crash at Chiang Mai, Thailand.
- 21 December
  - Police have arrested a man over his suspected involvement in December 20 fight at the Kota Raya shopping centre in the city.
  - Six cars were damaged in a fire at a car park near the Taman Jaya LRT station in Petaling Jaya, Selangor.
  - Mohd Ali Baharom, better known as Ali Tinju is arrested over last week's demonstration urging a boycott of traders at Kuala Lumpur's Kota Raya shopping complex.
- 23 December – The thirteen bodies mostly Malaysian tourist of the bus crash in Chiang Mai, Thailand were flown back to Malaysia.
- 24 December – The first anniversary of the Malaysia Airlines Flight MH370 crash:
  - The current underwater search for the missing Malaysia Airlines Flight MH370 in the southern Indian Ocean is expected to be completed in June 2016, the Australian Joint Agency Coordination Centre (JACC) said.
- 25 December – Four people killed and 26 others injured in an express bus-lorry crash at East–West Highway in Batu Melintang near Jeli, Kelantan.
- 26 December – A family outing of ten ended in tragedy when four of them died after their raft capsized in Sungai Bekok river near Yong Peng, Johor.
- 28 December
  - The first anniversary of the Indonesia AirAsia Flight QZ8501 crash.
  - A Malaysian Army officer, Captain Hasman Hussin who was reported missing in the Missouri floods on 26 December, has been found dead. His body was found at 11:00 am local time.
- 31 December
  - The formation of the ASEAN Community (AC).
  - The Malaysia Year of Festival 2015 is officially ended.

== National Day and Malaysia Day ==
=== Theme ===
Malaysia, Sehati Sejiwa (United, Unified Malaysia)

=== National Day parade ===
Merdeka Square, Kuala Lumpur

=== Malaysia Day celebration ===
Merdeka Square, Kota Kinabalu, Sabah

== Sports ==
- 25 November 2014 – 1 February 2015 – Purple League.
- 13–18 January – 2015 Malaysia Open Grand Prix Gold.
- 31 January – 2015 Sultan Haji Ahmad Shah Cup.
- 31 January – 29 August – 2015 Malaysia Super League.
- 1 February – 23 May – 2015 Malaysia FA Cup.
- 4 February – 28 August – 2015 Malaysia President's Cup.
- 6 February – 22 August – 2015 Malaysia Premier League.
- 28 February – 8 March – 2015 Malaysian Open.
- 8 March – 29 August – 2015 Malaysia FAM League.
- 8–15 March – 2015 Tour de Langkawi.
- 26–29 March – 58th Milo/PRAM Malaysia Open Swimming Championships 2015.
- 27–29 March – 2015 Petronas Malaysian Grand Prix.
- 27–29 March – 92nd Malaysia Open Athletics Championship 2015.
- 31 March – 5 April – 2015 Malaysia Super Series Premier.
- 21 April – 2015 World's Strongest Man, Putrajaya, Malaysia.
- 27 July – Liverpool FC tour 2015: Malaysia XI vs Liverpool FC.
- 30 July – 3 August – The 128th IOC Session.
- 31 July – 3 August – 2015 eni Superbike FIM World Championship, Sepang Circuit.
- 7–9 August – Kuala Lumpur City Grand Prix.
- 4 October – The Standard Chartered Kuala Lumpur International Marathon 2015 (Cancelled due to the 2015 Southeast Asian haze).
- 23–25 October – 2015 Shell Malaysia Motorcycle Grand Prix.
- 7 November – 2015 Putrajaya ePrix (2015–16 FIA Formula E Championship).
- 22 November – 2015 Penang Bridge International Marathon.

== Deaths ==
- 9 January – Tun Abdul Rahman Ya'kub – 4th Governor of Sarawak (1981–1985).
- 24 January – Tengku Ampuan Tua Intan Zaharah of Terengganu – 4th Raja Permaisuri Agong (1965–1970), a consort of Sultan Ismail Nasiruddin Shah 4th Yang di-Pertuan Agong (1965–1970) and also grandmother of current Sultan Mizan Zainal Abidin of Terengganu.
- 1 February – Othman Abdullah – former national footballer.
- 2 February – Nursyuhada Johari – A 20-year-old Universiti Teknologi MARA (UiTM) student.
- 3 February – Ahmad Ali, commonly known as "Mat Tarzan" – former bodybuilder from Penang in the 1950s and 1960s.
- 12 February
  - Hasbullah Awang – sports commentator.
  - Nik Abdul Aziz Nik Mat – 17th Menteri Besar of Kelantan (1990–2013), politician and spiritual leader of Pan-Malaysian Islamic Party (PAS).
- 4 April – Tan Sri Dr. Ir. Jamaluddin Jarjis – Member of Parliament for Rompin, former Minister of Science, Technology and Innovation, former Malaysian ambassador to the United States and also Perumahan Rakyat 1Malaysia Berhad (PR1MA) chairman.
- 14 May – Rahimidin Zahari – writer.
- 13 June – David Faramola Oniya – Terengganu F.C. II imported footballer from Nigeria.
- 16 September – Kevin Anthony Morais – deputy public prosecutor.
- 21 September – Tunku Raudzah binti Almarhum Sultan Sir Hishamuddin Alam Shah – Raja Puan Muda of Kedah.
- 1 October – Tan Sri Yuen Yuet Leng – former Royal Malaysian Police (RMP) Special Branch senior officer and heroes during Communist insurgency in Malaysia (1968–1989).
- 4 November – Tunku Hamidah binti Almarhum Sultan Badlishah, Sister of the 5th and 14th Yang di-Pertuan Agong, Sultan Abdul Halim Mu'adzam Shah of Kedah.
- 29 November – Tunku Abdul Malik ibni Almarhum Sultan Badlishah – Raja Muda of Kedah.
- 5 December – Tunku Abdul Jalil ibni Sultan Ibrahim – Tunku Laksamana Johor and also 4th son of the current Sultan Ibrahim of Johor.
- 28 December – Tiffany Leong – Actress.

== See also ==
- 2015
- 2014 in Malaysia | 2016 in Malaysia
- History of Malaysia
- List of Malaysian films of 2015
