= Bubalo =

Bubalo is a Serbo-Croatian-Bosnian surname, borne by ethnic Serbs, Croats and Bosniaks in Serbia, Croatia and Bosnia and Herzegovina. The word buba means "bug" or "beetle", and is derived from a pejorative nickname, based on character traits of its first bearers. At least 343 individuals with the surname died at the Jasenovac concentration camp.

It may refer to:

- Klaudija Bubalo (born 1970), retired Croatian handball player
- Krešimir Bubalo (born 1973), Croatian politician, Mayor of Osijek, his home city
- Milan Bubalo (born 1990), Serbian footballer
- Predrag Bubalo (born 1954), the former Serbian Minister of Industry and Privatization
- Stanko Bubalo (born 1973), Croatian football striker

== See also ==
- Babalu (disambiguation)
- Bebuloh
- Bubalu
- Bubbaloo
- Bubulo
