= Patau =

Patau may refer to:

- Klaus Patau, a geneticist who first reported Patau chromosome associated with Patau syndrome
- Patau chromosome, also known as Chromosome 13, associated with Patau syndrome
- Patau syndrome or Bartholin-Patau syndrome, associated with a trisomy of chromosome 13
- Patau-Patau, a village in Labuan, Malaysia
