= 2015 Plaza Low Yat riot =

Riot in Kuala Lumpur, Malaysia

- Date: July 11, 2015; 11 years ago
- Time: 5:40 p.m. (UTC+8)
- Location: Jalan Imbi, Kuala Lumpur, Malaysia
- Cause: Misunderstandings related to smartphones with racial incitement by various media
- Target: Plaza Low Yat
- Outcome: Losses are estimated at more than RM70,000
- Injuries: 5
- Arrests: 18

On 12 July 2015, a riot occurred at Plaza Low Yat, a major electronics shopping center in Kuala Lumpur, Malaysia. The incident attracted widespread media attention and raised concerns about racial tensions in the country. Five people, including a journalist, were injured during the unrest, while businesses suffered significant property damage.

The disturbances originated from an incident the previous day involving the theft of a smartphone from a Chinese-owned mobile phone outlet. According to police investigations, a Malay man was caught stealing a smartphone and was subsequently handed over to the authorities. Police later maintained that the case was a straightforward theft and rejected claims circulating online that the dispute had involved the sale of a counterfeit phone.

Following the arrest, the suspect reportedly returned with a group of associates who assaulted employees of the mobile phone shop and vandalised the premises. The attack caused an estimated RM70,000 in losses and affected workers who had been carrying out their duties at the store.

Despite police statements regarding the nature of the incident, rumours rapidly spread on social media portraying Chinese traders as dishonest and accusing them of cheating Malay customers. These allegations were not supported by police findings, yet they gained significant traction online and contributed to growing hostility towards the Chinese business community associated with Plaza Low Yat.

On the evening of 12 July, a crowd gathered outside the shopping centre and the situation escalated into a riot. Videos circulated online showing groups attacking a vehicle carrying passengers and assaulting journalists from Chinese-language media organisations. The attacks on journalists drew particular concern as members of the press became targets while covering the events.

The unrest was accompanied by a wave of racially charged messages on social media, including calls to boycott Chinese businesses through hashtags such as "#BoikotCinaPenipu" ("Boycott Cheating Chinese"). Some posts portrayed the Chinese community as responsible for the incident despite the police conclusion that it originated from an theft. Other messages promoted racial division and included threats of violence.

Videos from the gathering also showed individuals delivering speeches that invoked racial sentiments. One speaker described Malaysia as "bumi Melayu" and accused the Chinese community of humiliating Malays. Such racial remarks further intensified tensions and shifted public attention away from the original criminal case toward broader racial issues.

Authorities condemned the violence and arrested 18 individuals in connection with the disturbances. The riot highlighted how misinformation and racially charged remarks could rapidly inflame tensions, while Chinese business owners, employees, journalists, and members of the public became among those directly affected by the violence.

== Aftermath ==
Following the riot, the Prime Minister at the time, Najib Razak insisted that the incident should be seen as a criminal act and not a racial problem. Najib described the actions of some parties who used social media to incite the racial element in the incident as irresponsible and gave an inaccurate perspective on what actually happened. He also asked the Inspector-General of Police, Khalid Abu Bakar to take effective action to prevent similar incidents from happening again. Five days after the riots, Plaza Low Yat continued to be the main choice for visitors to buy mobile phones as well as computers and software.
