= Malay Dignity rally =

Rally in Kuala Lumpur, Malaysia

- Date: 16 September 2015
- Location: Kuala Lumpur
- Caused by: Counter-protest against Bersih 4 rally; show of support to the incumbent Prime Minister of Malaysia, Najib Razak and his government
- Goals: 1. To act as a strong deterrent to those who insult Malay leaders, and to safeguard the status of Islam in the Federal Constitution; 2. To rally Malays in a show of solidarity, in view of core tenets enshrined in the Constitution including social justice; 3. To demand that the Government take stern action against those who betray the nation by perpetrating lies and putting the credibility of the Government into question, in an attempt to bring down a democratically elected administration; 4. To demand that the Government implement a singular and unifieud national school system with no compromise, as a means of showing Malay dominance; 5. To demand that the Government implement policies that are guaranteed in the Constitution, specifically related to special Malays rights and Bumiputera privileges; 6. To call on the Government to reinstate the Internal Security Act (ISA) as part of efforts to ensure the safety and security of the nation; 7. To instill patriotism and love for country in the rakyat, in line with strengthening national unity; 8. To ensure that gatherings like Bersih will not re-occur in the future.
- Methods: Demonstration, poetry reading, speeches.

Parties
National Silat Federation; Himpunan Maruah Melayu; 250 NGOs	BERSIH organisers

Number
200,000 (PESAKA estimation); 30,000 (Police estimation)	

The Malay Dignity rally (Malay: Himpunan Maruah Melayu) was a rally that took place on 16 September 2015 in Kuala Lumpur, Malaysia. The rally was organised by National Silat Federation (Malay: Persatuan Silat Kebangsaan, PESAKA), a silat Melayu federation of Malaysia. The rally aimed to counter the Bersih 4 rally and to show support for the incumbent Prime Minister of Malaysia, Najib Razak and his government. 16 September is the day of Malaysia's establishment. The rally organiser, also an UMNO Supreme Council member, Annuar Musa admitted that the rally was racist in nature and participants were paid to take part in the rally. Medias reported that some of the participants who were ferried into Kuala Lumpur by buses from various parts of the country revealed they were clueless about the purpose of the rally, saying they were given the red T-shirts, while an independent polling centre found that only 24% of Malays supported the rally, and 53% opposed it.

== Background ==
In 2015, two years after general elections in Malaysia, Malaysia was faced with multiple issues and controversies which threatened the premiership of Najib Razak. Ringgit Malaysia, the nation's currency, fell to a 17-year low due to falling oil prices. There was a corruption scandal involving a government super fund called 1Malaysia Development Berhad and a series of exposes by online investigative blogs, namely Sarawak Report and major news portal The Wall Street Journal, claiming that money was being siphoned off from the fund into personal accounts of Najib and his close relations. Suspicion was heightened by the removal of Abdul Gani Patail, the Attorney General of Malaysia who was part of the task force investigating the 1MDB scandal, and reshuffling of second Najib cabinet which involved the dropping of his deputy Muhyiddin Yassin and four other ministers. The Public Accounts Committee investigating the 1MDB scandal was also suspended indefinitely with the promotion of four of its members to Deputy Ministers by Najib.

The subsequent events led Bersih, a non-governmental organisation (NGO) which promotes electoral reform, to hold a "Bersih rally" in August 2015, called Bersih 4. Frustrated with these rallies which it regarded as undermining the capability of Najib Razak to lead the nation, the President of PESAKA, Tan Sri Mohd Ali Mohd Rustam organised the United People's rally.

=== Himpunan Maruah Melayu ===
Himpunan Maruah Melayu (more popularly known as the 'Red Shirts') was a rally aiming to defend the special rights of the Malays. It was led by the president of Malay NGOs' coalition, Dato Jamal Yunos. Its members represented 250 Malay NGOs. It proposed to assemble at five locations (initially seven, which included the Chinese-majority Low Yat Plaza) before joining the United People's Rally at Padang Merbok. The organisers of the United People's Rally, however, did not recognise nor acknowledge the presence of Himpunan Maruah Melayu.

== Objective ==
Malay Dignity rally has outlined eight main objectives:

1. To act as a strong deterrent to those who insult Malay leaders, and to safeguard the status of Islam in the Federal Constitution;
2. To rally Malays in a show of solidarity, in view of core tenets enshrined in the Constitution including social justice;
3. To demand that the Government take stern action against those who betray the nation by perpetrating lies and putting the credibility of the Government into question, in an attempt to bring down a democratically elected administration;
4. To demand that the Government implement a singular and unified national school system with no compromise, as a means of showing Malay dominance;
5. To demand that the Government implement policies that are guaranteed in the Constitution, specifically related to special Malays' rights and Bumiputera privileges;
6. To call on the Government to reinstate the Internal Security Act (ISA) as part of efforts to ensure the safety and security of the nation;
7. To instill patriotism and love for country in the rakyat, in line with strengthening national unity;
8. To ensure that gatherings like Bersih 4 rally will not re-occur in the future.

== Rally plans and pre-rally incidents ==
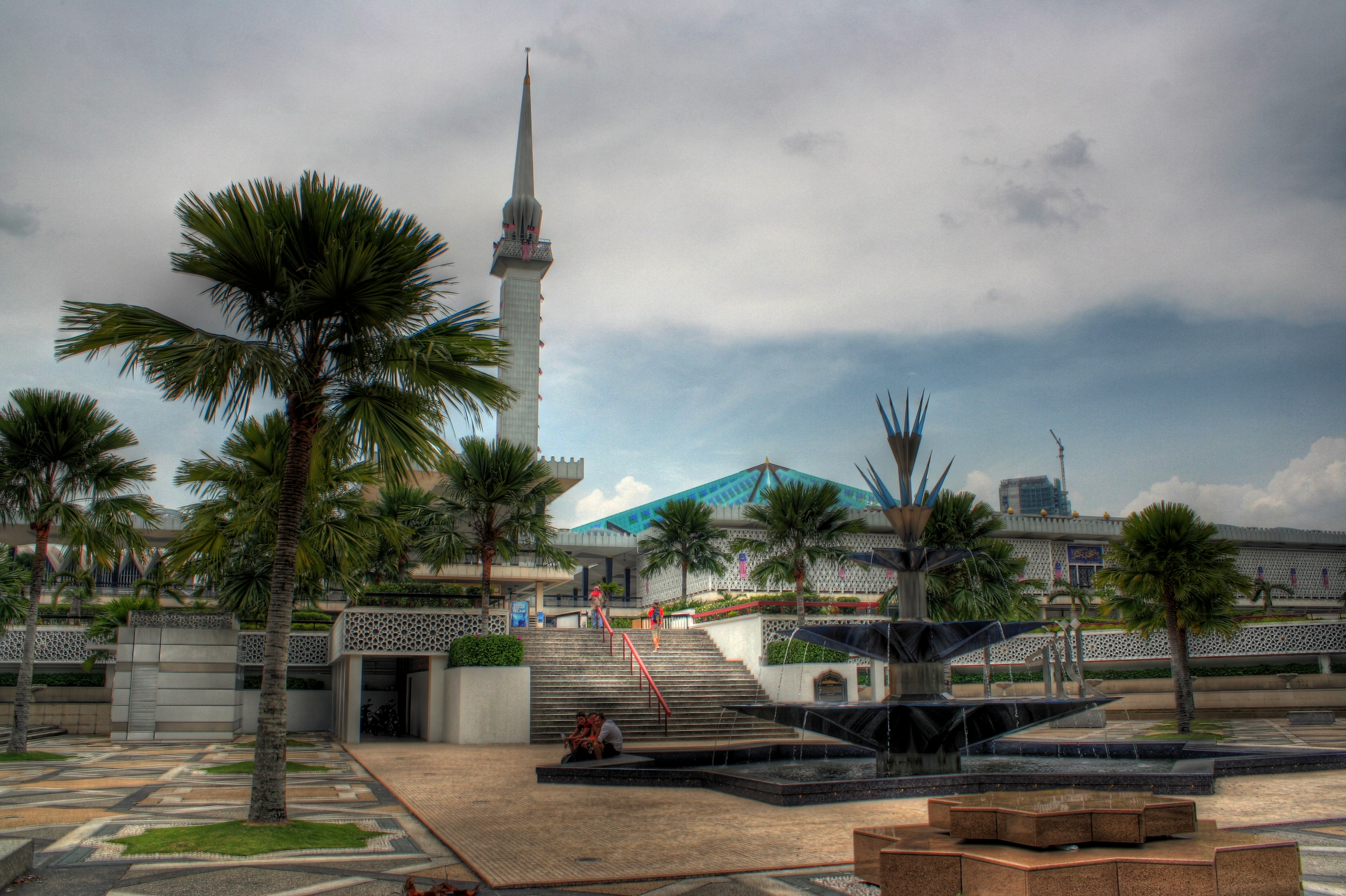
Masjid Negara, one of the assembly point of the rally

Participants were to convene at 11am Wednesday at Bukit Bintang and march to Padang Merbok at 3pm. There were three rally check points: Masjid Negara, Masjid Al Bukhary on Jalan Hang Tuah, and Kompleks Kraf on Jalan Conlay.

On Monday, 14 Sep, KL Mayor Mohd Amin Nordin Abdul Aziz confirmed that KL City Hall had approved the permit application submitted by PESAKA on 8 Sep to use Padang Merbok as the rally venue.

Inspector-General of Police Tan Sri Khalid Abu Bakar also declared the gathering as legal under the Peaceful Assembly Act 2012. He said the police would deploy enough manpower to help secure the safety and security of everyone in Kuala Lumpur.

In the run-up to the “red shirt” rally, Kota Bharu UMNO division chief Mohd Fatmi Che Salleh made a speech and led a group of UMNO members as they burned effigies of DAP parliamentary leader Lim Kit Siang and of DAP secretary-general Lim Guan Eng.

It was earlier reported that 773 hawkers and 500 shop owners in Petaling Street had decided to suspend operations on 16 Sep as a precaution, to avoid anything untoward. while Otai Reformasi have pledged to send 500 members to monitor the rally.

10,000 masks were distributed for rally goers due to worsening haze conditions. 3,000 PESAKA members and 20,000 members of Armed Forces Veterans Associations were deployed to ensure safety at Padang Merbok.

== Rally incidents ==
Incidents of violence were seen involving protesters and police personnel, after the rally participants tried to force their way into Petaling Street or Chinatown. A couple of red shirted protestors and police personnel were injured after the protestors refused to disperse and tried to break through the police barricades. The police Federal Reserve Unit began using water cannons to disperse the protesters, after the red shirts began throwing rocks and water bottles at them.

== Aftermath ==
Abdul Rahman Dahlan declared the rally as a success. Jamal Md Yunos alleged that provocation from DAP and pro-opposition members caused the incidents in Petaling Street.

Political parties from both sides of the political spectrum such as Democratic Action Party, Malaysian Chinese Association and Parti Gerakan Rakyat Malaysia filed police reports regarding racial statements by the organisers. Prime Minister Najib called for an investigation regarding the clashes between the police and protesters.
