= Tangkap Najib rally =

2015 demonstration in Malaysia

- Date: 1 August 2015
- Location: Kuala Lumpur, Malaysia
- Goals: Resignation of Prime Minister Najib Razak

Parties
Demi Malaysia; Pakatan Rakyat	Najib Razak; United Malays National Organisation

Lead figures
Adam Adli; Syukri Rezab	Najib Razak

Number
200	80

Casualties and losses
29 individuals arrested	

The Tangkap Najib rally (also called the #TangkapNajib Protest) was a demonstration held in Kuala Lumpur on 1 August 2015. The peaceful rally was organized by a youth activist group Demi Malaysia to urge for the resignation of Prime Minister of Malaysia Najib Razak ensuing the 1Malaysia Development Berhad scandal.

The rally was among the first few protests held to directly pressure the Prime Minister of Malaysia to resign for the implication in the 1Malaysia Development Berhad scandal.

== Background ==
Ensuing the 1Malaysia Development Berhad scandal implicating the Malaysian Prime Minister Najib Razak, a group of activists known as Gabungan Anak Muda Demi Malaysia (Coalition of Youth for Malaysia), or alternatively as Demi Malaysia, has called for a peaceful gathering on 1 August 2015 at 2:00pm near Sogo Shopping Complex at Kuala Lumpur to urge the Najib Razak to resign with immediate effect.

According to the spokesperson for the group Adam Adli, the rally was an attempt to "save the country and free the people from continued economic, political and social uncertainty". According to another student activist Safwan Anang, the rally was also intended to generate momentum for the upcoming Bersih 4 rally.

== Early Arrests ==
On 31 July 2015, one day prior to the rally, the spokesperson of Demi Malaysia Adam Adli and student activist Syukri Rezab went to Dang Wangi police station to meet the Dang Wangi police on the rally on the subsequent day. According to another student activist Mandep Singh, they had "gone to the police station at the request of the police, who had promised them that no arrests would be made, or statements taken", and informed that "only some discussion will be held".

However, student activist Syukri Rezab was detained at 4:25pm and Adam Adli was detained 20 minutes later under the Section 124(b) of the Penal Code for activities detrimental to parliamentary democracy as well as the Sedition Act. Human rights lawyer Michelle Yesudas has stated that Syukri was "nabbed suddenly" as the Demi Malaysia group was meeting with police about the Tangkap Najib rally scheduled on the subsequent day. Human rights lawyer Latheefa Koya has also added that what happened to them "clearly showed that they had been duped to come in".

== Events ==
Despite warnings from the police, the organizers announced their plans to continue with the peaceful assembly. The Royal Malaysia Police has declared the #TangkapNajib rally as illegal, and stated that serious actions will be taken against the organizers and the participants of the rally. Student activist leader Adam Adli, acting as spokesperson for the organizing committee Demi Malaysia claimed that the warning issued by Inspector-General of Police Khalid Abu Bakar was merely "a tactic to discourage any show of dissent towards Prime Minister Najib Razak", and insisted that the demonstration's organisers were prepared to cooperate with the police if needed.

Police were there since 12.30pm, with some also being stationed at nearby train stations to prevent people from taking part in the rally.

Despite explicit warning issued by the Royal Malaysia Police, the rally was carried out at 2:00pm outside Sogo Shopping Complex.

Sogo shopping complex and boutiques along Jalan Tuanku Abdul Rahman (TAR) closed temporarily by 2.30pm.

The mall was forced to close down when the situation got out of control as police moved in to arrest participants who refused to disperse at the gathering to call for the arrest of Prime Minister Datuk Seri Najib Razak But the rally was short-lived.

As soon as a crowd of 200 or so had gathered by 2pm, a series of arrests took place. A heavy police presence made of 80 personnel was seen gathering at Sogo earlier at 1.30pm.

Later, a tear gas cylinder was reported to have been shot at 2.27pm. Source: http://www.theborneopost.com/2015/08/01/state-assemblyman-arrested-at-tangkapnajib-rally

By 3pm, 20 or so youths were arrested and immediately taken to Kuala Lumpur Contingent Police Headquarters, according to Lawyers for Liberty executive director Eric Paulsen, who was present.

Source: http://www.therakyatpost.com/news/2015/08/01/rally-outside-sogo-short-lived-with-several-arrests-made-within-half-an-hour/

== Aftermath and Arrests ==
Police arrested Simpang Pulai assemblyman Tan Kar Hing and Teja assemblyman Chang Lih Kang when they refused to leave the area and stop the assembly. Annie Ooi, nicknamed ‘Aunty Bersih’, has also been arrested.

== See also ==
- Najib Razak controversies
- 2015 in Malaysia
- List of protests in the 21st century
