= Babalu =

Babalu may refer to:

- "Babalú", a 1939 song popularized by Desi Arnaz in the 1940s
- BaBalu, a 2001 Michael Bublé album
- Babalu, a village in West Azerbaijan Province, Iran
- Babalu, a village in Gilan, Iran
- The nickname for mixed martial artist Renato Sobral
- Babalu (comedian) (1942–1998), screen name of the Filipino actor Pablito Sarmiento Jr.
- A character in the novel Daughter of Fortune by Isabel Allende

== See also ==
- Babalú Ayé, the spirit of illness and disease in Yoruba mythology
- Babaloo Mandel (born 1949), American writer
- Babilu, another name for Babylon
