= Anthony Kevin Morais =

Malaysian prosecutor (1960–2015)

Datuk Anthony Kevin Morais
- Born: 22 March 1960; Kuala Lumpur, Federation of Malaya
- Disappeared: 4 September 2015 (aged 55); Kuala Lumpur, Malaysia
- Cause of death: Murder
- Body discovered: 16 September 2015 (aged 55); Subang Jaya, Selangor, Malaysia
- Resting place: Church of Our Mother of Perpetual Help, Ipoh
- Occupation: Prosecutor

Anthony Kevin Morais (22 March 1960 – c. September 2015) was a Malaysian prosecutor who served as deputy public prosecutor for the Attorney General of Malaysia and Malaysian Anti-Corruption Commission.

== Early life ==
Anthony Kevin Morais was born to Francis Bede Morais and Lourdes Louis on 22 March 1960 in Kuala Lumpur. He is the eldest of four brothers. His younger brothers are Charles Suresh, David Ramesh and Richard Dilaan. His father was a former Deputy Director (Licensing) at Radio Televisyen Malaysia (RTM), while his mother was a full-time housewife.

== Career ==
Morais started out as a Magistrate in Sungai Siput in the 1980s after completing his chambering at a firm of solicitors in Ipoh, Perak. He was later promoted as a Registrar of the Ipoh High Court where he remained there until 2000, when he transferred to Kuala Lumpur to become the Registrar of the KL High Court.

=== 1MDB investigation ===
Morais had been seconded from the Law Ministry to the Malaysian Anti-Corruption Commission, which was looking into financial irregularities involving the troubled 1Malaysia Development Berhad (1MDB), a state-backed investment fund and other issues.

In 2015, reporter Clare Rewcastle Brown published anonymous emails to her blog, leaking the secret draft arrest warrant for Malaysian prime minister Najib Razak. This led to immediate backlash from Najib and all parties involved. Morais was the drafter of the arrest warrant. The 2023 Netflix documentary, Man on the Run, implies that due to this Najib and/or close authorities placed a bounty on Morais. Morais' brother has repeated these claims. S. Ravi Chandaran, one of the accused, claimed that Najib offered him RM3.5 million ($735,000 USD in 2024) to admit guilt to the crime.

== Murder ==
Morais was last seen alive on 4 September 2015 leaving his Menara Duta condominium in Segambut, Kuala Lumpur for work at the Attorney-General's Chambers in Putrajaya. He drove a Proton Perdana with license plates WA6264Q. His youngest brother filed a missing person's report late next day. Earlier, a car matching the model he owned was found in a palm oil plantation in Perak. His body was found in a concrete filled drum at USJ 1, Subang Jaya, Selangor on 16 September 2015.

On 20 November 2017, six were accused of the murder of Morais after the courts found that the prosecution had proven a prima facie against them. The six accused were former army pathologist Colonel Dr R. Kunaseegaran, 55; R. Dinishwaran, 26; A.K Thinesh Kumar, 25; M. Vishwanath, 28; S. Nimalan 25; and S. Ravi Chandran, 47.

Initially, there were seven accused individuals in the trial; however, G. Gunasekaran was discharged and acquitted in 2016 after the prosecution had applied to withdraw the charge against him. The Sessions Court sentenced Gunasekaran to two years in jail effective from the date of his arrest on 15 September 2015, after he pleaded guilty to concealing Kevin Morais' body and disposing of the plate number of the deceased's car. The prosecution set out to prove that the motive for the murder of Kevin Morais had been revenge as Morais had been the prosecuting officer in the corruption case against Kunaseegaran.

On 10 July 2020, after a lengthy 4-year court trial, the High Court found all six accused guilty of murder and sentenced them to death by hanging.

On 15 March 2024, the Court of Appeal dismissed the appeals of the six men, and upheld their convictions and sentences.

On 1 July 2025, the Federal Court upheld the murder conviction of three accused, namely Kunaseegaran, Nimalan, and Ravi Chandran. Kunaseegaran's death sentence was maintained by the court as he had withdrawn his appeal during the mitigation stage, while Ravi Chandran was commuted to 35 years prison with 12 strokes of whipping and Ravi Chandran was commuted to 40 years imprisonment instead. The three other accused, namely Dinishwaran, Thinesh Kumar, and Vishwanath were acquitted and released by the Federal Court.

== Funeral ==
Between 24 and 26 September 2015, a three-day wake was held at the Nirvana Memorial Centre in Sungai Besi, Kuala Lumpur, although Morais's remains has yet to be reclaimed from Kuala Lumpur Hospital mortuary by his family. The memorial service was attended by his relatives and friends, including some 100 of his colleagues from Attorney General's Chambers and Mohamed Apandi Ali, the Attorney General of Malaysia.

On 26 September, a memorial mass was also held at the St Joseph's Church in Sentul, which also saw the attendance of Batu MP, Tian Chua.

On 3 October, a funeral mass was held at the Church of the Devine Mercy in Shah Alam, even though his body has yet to be reclaimed by his family. The funeral mass was attended by hundreds of his family members, friends and colleagues from the Attorney-General's Chambers, the Malaysian Bar and the Malaysian Anti-Corruption Commission.

On 23 November, Morais's family finally retrieved his remains from the hospital mortuary and did not proceed with the initial demand to conduct a second autopsy. His body was cremated on the same day.

On 27 February 2016, a memorial mass was held at the Church of Our Lady of Lourdes in Silibin, Ipoh, which saw around 300 people attended the mass. Morais's ashes was then interred at the columbarium of the Church of Our Mother of Perpetual Help in Ipoh Garden on the same day.

== Legacy ==
On 27 November 2015, in conjunction with the 59th birthday of the Sultan of Perak. Anthony Kevin Morais received the Darjah Datuk Paduka Mahkota Perak (DPMP), which carries the title "Dato’" from the 35th Sultan of Perak, Sultan Nazrin Muizzuddin Shah.

In the Malaysian Anti Corruption Academy, there is a moot court named "Kevin Morais Moot Court" which was renamed after his death.

In 2020, Morais was named as one of the two recipients of the International Anti-Corruption Award 2020 at the Perdana International Anti-Corruption Champion Fund (PIACCF).

== Honours ==
- Malaysia
  - Officer of the Order of the Defender of the Realm (KMN) (2009)
  - Commander of the Order of Meritorious Service (PJN) – Datuk (2017 – Posthumously)
- Perak
  - Knight Commander of the Order of the Perak State Crown (DPMP) – Dato' (2015 – Posthumously)

== See also ==
- Death of Teoh Beng Hock
- 1Malaysia Development Berhad scandal
- Murder of Shaariibuugiin Altantuyaa
- Murder of Jalil Ibrahim
- Najib Razak controversies
