= Patau-Patau =

Coordinates: 5.2871509°N 115.2361639°E

Patau-Patau (Malay: Kampung Air Patau-Patau, lit. 'Village Water Patau-Patau') is a fishing village in Labuan, Malaysia, that is principally inhabited by descendants of Brunei Malays who settled there in the 1930s. Patau-Patau was destroyed by bombing during World War II but was rebuilt afterwards. The village's houses are built on stilts over water in its bay, and connected by wooden or concrete walkways. It is one of two such "water villages" on Labuan, the other being Kampung Bebuloh. In addition to fishing and general tourism activities, the village runs a homestay programme.
