= Premiership of Najib Razak =

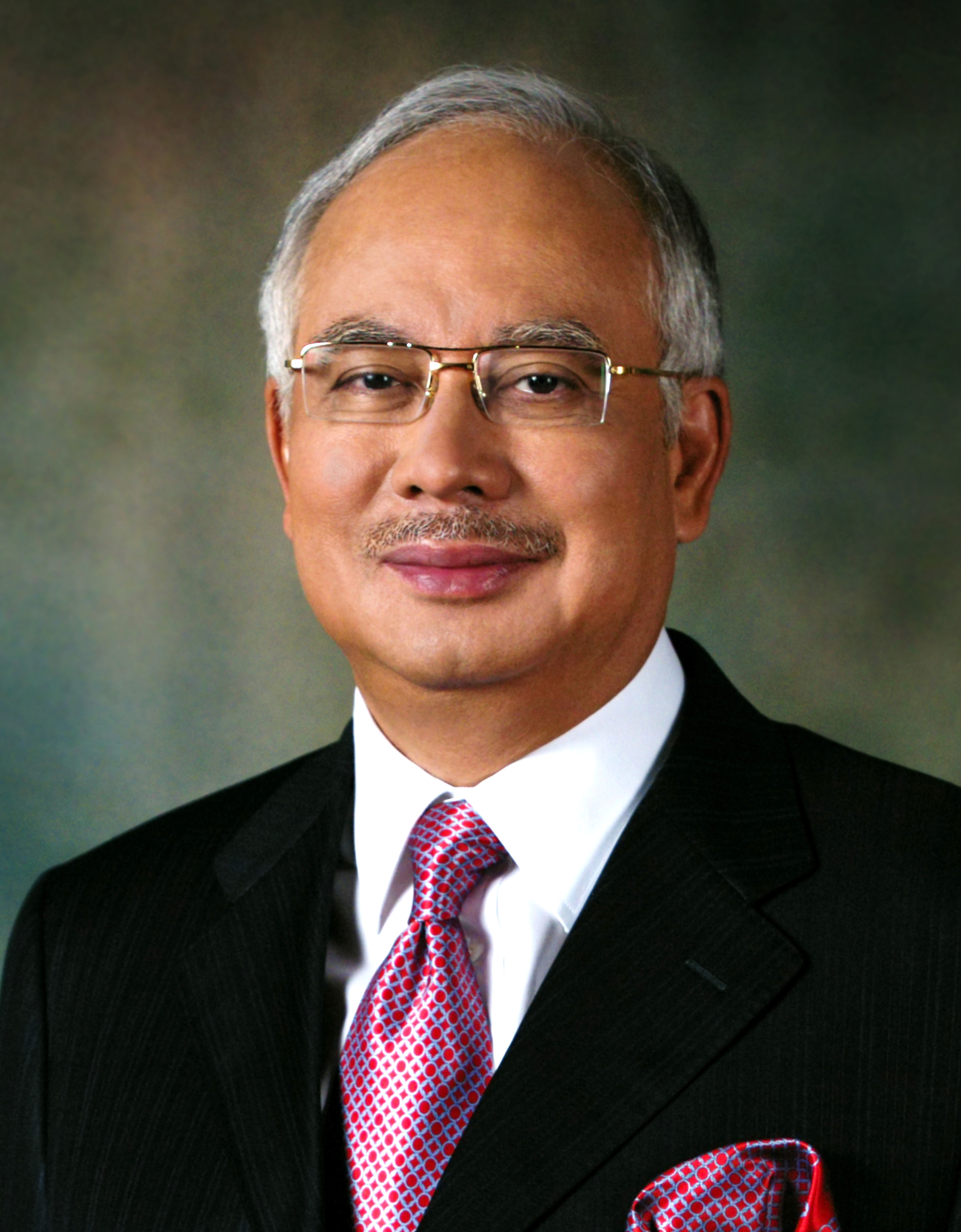
- Official portrait, 2008
- Premiership of Najib Razak; 3 April 2009 – 9 May 2018
- Monarchs: Mizan Zainal Abidin; Abdul Halim; Muhammad V
- Prime Minister: Najib Razak
- Cabinet: Najib I; Najib II
- Party: BN-UMNO
- Election: 2013
- Seat: Seri Perdana

The Najib Government was the federal executive government of Malaysia led by the Prime Minister, Najib Razak. The government was made up of members of the Barisan Nasional. Following the resignation of incumbent Prime Minister, Abdullah Ahmad Badawi, Najib sworn in to become the sixth Prime Minister of Malaysia on 3 April 2009. Najib announced his inaugural Cabinet on 9 April 2009. after Barisan Nasional's victory in the 2013 Malaysian general election, Najib resumed his leadership as prime minister and was sworn in on 7 May 2013 for a second term. His premiership ended after defeated of Barisan Nasional in 2018 Malaysian general election. After that he faces dozens of charges over his involvement in the 1Malaysia Development Berhad scandal.

== First 100 days ==
Najib entered office with a clear focus on domestic economic issues and long-standing political reform questions. On his first day as Prime Minister, Najib announced as his first actions the removal of bans on two opposition newspapers, Suara Keadilan and Harakahdaily, run by the opposition leader Anwar Ibrahim-led People's Justice Party and the Pan Islamic Party, respectively, and the release of 13 people held under the Internal Security Act. He pledged to conduct a comprehensive review of the much-criticised law which allows for indefinite detention without trial. In the speech, he emphasised his commitment to tackling poverty, restructuring Malaysian society, expanding access to quality education for all, and promoting renewed "passion for public service." In a speech given to the media on 6 April 2009, Najib stated that Malaysia must establish "a new national discourse," based on the principles of "transparency and accountability", "service to all"; and "respect and fairness in the public dialogue", in which "world-class, fact based reporting" including the new media led to better governance through "vibrant public dialogue."

== Policies ==
=== Economy ===
In his first month in office, Najib announced two packages of economic reforms, the first focused on the services sector, and the second on the financial services sector.

==== Services sector ====
On 23 April 2009, Najib announced immediate liberalisation of 27 services sub-sectors, covering health and social services, tourism services, transport services, business services and computer and related services accounting for 57 per cent of the total employment in Malaysia. Najib announced that the liberalisation was designed to attract foreign investment, and technology to create what he termed "higher value employment opportunities," and to enhance Malaysian competitiveness. The liberalisation included scrapping a 30 per cent Bumiputera ownership requirement for investment in some services sector to help boost the country's flagging economy, with immediate effect. Najib also announced that five foreign law firms would be allowed to offer services in Islamic finance. Independent analysts described these actions as a positive move that needed to be accompanied by further action to move beyond historic preferences for Malays to have a substantial impact on the economy.

==== Financial sector ====
On 27 April 2009, Najib a package of measures to liberalise the financial sector including raising the equity in investment and Islamic banks and insurance and Takaful firms to 70 percent from 49 percent. Najib said two new Islamic banking licenses and two new commercial banking licenses would also be offered to foreign players with specialised expertise. He stated that the government would offer up to three new commercial banking licences in 2011 to world-class banks that can offer significant value propositions to Malaysia. The liberalisation measures were described as providing a mechanism to attract foreign capital by allowing foreign institutions to obtain up to 70 percent of the equity in any of these types of financial institutions in Malaysia. He also announced the liberalisation of rules on investment banks, insurance companies, and takaful operators, to give them the flexibility to enter into foreign strategic partnerships to enhance international linkages and business opportunities. He further stated that a higher foreign equity limit beyond 70 percent for insurance companies would be considered on a case-by-case basis for players who could facilitate consolidation and rationalisation of the insurance industry.

These additional steps were characterised by independent analysts as a significant liberalisation of previous rules designed to promote Malay control of the country's financial services sector, and as likely to strengthen Malaysia's ability to participate in global financial services developments, although some criticised Najib for not raising the foreign equity participation for the country's commercial banks beyond the existing 30%.

=== Human rights ===
One of Najib's first acts as Prime Minister was to release a few Internal Security Act detainees. On 8 May 2009 it was announced by the Malaysian Home Ministry that the remaining three Hindu Rights Action Front leaders and 10 others are to be freed from detention under the Internal Security Act. Najib disputes allegations that the release of the Hindraf leaders was to counter negative public opinion over the Perak state assembly crisis.

=== Education ===
On 14 April 2009, Najib announced initiatives on early childhood education, emphasising accessibility and affordability. He stated that the government would continue to support incentives for providing such education, such as by granting a 10 per cent tax reduction per annum to employers who set up childcare centres at the workplace on the cost of establishment of the centre for a period of 10 years. In addition, he said the government would provide RM 80,000 grants to government agencies to provide childcare centres at agency workplaces for renovation and furnishing such centres. He announced that the government had formulated a National Policy for Early Childhood Education and Care developed by the country's Permata program, and had accepted Permata's curriculum as the guiding principle for a national curriculum for early childhood education. He stated that the government had allocated an additional RM 145 million to facilitate the building of 150 childcare centres by Permata.

There have been disagreements about the scrapping the use of English to teach maths and science in all schools which will begin in 2012 by Barisan Nasional partner parties MCA and Gerakan. They have called for the policy to be retained in secondary schools. Former Prime Minister Mahathir Mohamad, who opposes the move, used his blog to run a poll on the government's decision where out of the 26,000 who voted, about 80 per cent said they were against the reversal. Another poll on the issue, as part of the independent Merdeka Centre's survey on Prime Minister Najib Razak's first 100 days in office, showed that 58 per cent of the 1,060 respondents wanted the policy of teaching maths and science in English to continue.

=== Civil service ===
On 28 April 2009, Najib proposed structural reforms in the civil service to allow top posts in the public sector to become opened to persons from the private sector and government-linked companies (GLCs) in addition to existing personnel in the administrative and diplomatic service. He said his proposal for a multi-level entry system for the civil service would benefit from the cross-fertilisation between the talents of the public and private sectors and the GLCs. He also proposed an open-door policy whereby civil service officers can be loaned to the GLCs and vice versa for mutual acquisition of knowledge. He announced as government policy four paradigm shifts for modernising the civil service, including (1) recognition that wealth was created in the private sector, requiring government to ensure that its regulations promoted private sector capacity to generate wealth, rather than block it; (2) to move beyond evaluating success based on output to one based on outcome," he said, citing as example education where emphasis should be given not only to having enough schools and laboratories but also the overall success, including the students' welfare and morale; (3) moving from bureaucracy which made things difficult to one which made things simple and easy for the people; and (4) moving from a focus on productivity to one that combines productivity, creativity and innovation.

=== Government reform ===
On 10 April 2009, Najib introduced a series of key performance indicators (KPIs) to gauge the performance and achievements of his Cabinet to provide a mechanism for the evaluation of each ministry of government, with a system for six-month reviews to assess effectiveness. He promised to review any Minister who failed to meet KPI standards, which Najib said would focus on impact, rather than inputs, and outcomes, rather than outputs, to ensure effective public service delivery. Najib stated that each of the government's 40 deputy ministers would be given specific tasks, and required each minister to establish KPIs complete with job specifications for themselves and their deputies within 30 days. Initial KPIs were established by mid-May 2009, described as "preliminary," with a second round to follow based on a six-month assessment in November 2009.

=== Minority outreach ===
In his first days in office, Najib visited the offices of a major Chinese-language newspaper and emphasised the importance of the Chinese community to Malaysia, before undertaking other direct outreach to Indian-origin communities of Malaysia including the Tamils, Malayalees and Sikhs. At the same time, he called for all Malaysia's ethnic communities to reach out beyond what he termed their "ethnic silos", stating on 15 April 2009 that Malaysians must "stand together, think and act as one people under the '1Malaysia concept'." Najib urged Malaysians to "break away from operating in the ethnic prism as we have done over so many years", and to "go beyond tolerance and build trust among each other and build trust between various ethnic groups."

=== Foreign policy ===
Najib's initial actions as Prime Minister focused on economic stabilisation and domestic reforms, and did not visibly change long-standing Malaysian foreign policy.

Najib's initial actions on foreign policy involved undertaking low-profile bilateral meetings with local counterparts. These included Indonesia, where the discussions involved heightening co-operation on tourism, oil and gas, and high-technology industries as well as electricity supply; Singapore, where the governments reviewed co-operation on enhanced transportation links, including a possible third bridge between Singapore and Malaysia; and Brunei, where Najib focused on border issues.

In his first months in office, Najib has left broad policy statements to his new Foreign Minister, Datuk Anifah Aman, whose initial focus has been to re-emphasise Malaysia's long-time demand that the Israeli government agree to and act on a two-state solution that creates an independent Palestine, plus a new focus on counter-proliferation, including endorsement of new policies undertaken in the United States by the Obama Administration relating to reducing existing nuclear arsenals.

== 1Malaysia and the scandal ==
On 17 September 2008, Najib launched his personal website at www.1Malaysia.com.my in an effort to increase communication with the people. As Prime Minister, he has used the site as a communications portal to highlight his political and policy initiatives and to provide a location to solicit the opinions and policy goals of any Malaysians who choose to take part in the site. While Najib has personally emphasised the meaning of 1Malaysia as an effort to unify that which is common to all Malaysians, during the initial days of his new government, the 1Malaysia concept has become subject to a broad range of interpretations and discussion, both by those in favour of and opposed to particular government policies, and involving different elements of Malaysia's major ethnic groups.

However, Najib has been criticised for an apparent deterioration of race relations in Malaysia during his tenure that has occurred despite the 1Malaysia programme. In 2014, former Prime Minister Mahathir Mohamad withdrew his support for Najib citing, among other things, the abandonment by Chinese voters of the Barisan Nasional coalition. Najib's tenure has also been marked by increasingly aggressive racial rhetoric from elements within Najib's UMNO party, particularly towards Chinese Malaysians.

In 2015, after only six years of operations, 1MDB had reportedly incurred debts of MYR 42 billion (about US$11.1 billion), prompting a negative outlook on the country's economic growth. On July 2, 2015, The Wall Street Journal ran an exposé alleging that MYR 2.672 billion (US$700 million) had been channelled from 1MDB into Najib's personal bank accounts, triggering widespread calls for his resignation. Najib responded to the corruption allegations by claiming that the RM 2.6 billion was a political donation, and replacing the Deputy Prime Minister, Muhyiddin Yassin, as well as other Ministers who had been critical of his leadership. Najib stated that the reason for this was to create a more "unified team".

== Controversies and issues ==
=== LGBT Rights ===
Najib stated in a speech in August 2015 at an international Islamic moderation seminar in Selangor, that he believed Malaysia should not support LGBT rights. Najib stated that his administration will do its best to uphold human rights but only within the confines of Islam and that Malaysia cannot defend the more "extreme aspect of human rights", such as gay, lesbian and transsexual rights. This prompted Human Rights Watch to suggest that Malaysia withdraw from the United Nations if the government was not serious about upholding human rights for all.

=== National Security Council Bill 2015 ===
In December 2015, the National Security Council Bill 2015 was passed in Parliament after a marathon six-hour debate. The bill provides the Prime Minister of Malaysia with unprecedented powers, such as the ability to define what constitutes a security issue as well as deem any part of Malaysia a security area. Within that area, authorities may make arrests, conduct searches or seize property without a warrant. The bill was criticized by rights groups as inviting government abuse. The Malaysian Bar called it a "lurch towards an authoritarian government". The government defended the bill, with cabinet minister Shahidan Kassim saying the law is necessary to enable better coordination and a uniform response in the event the country is faced with security threats, and that the law does not contravene the basic human rights guaranteed under the federal constitution.
