= MT Orkim Harmony =

History
- Name: Orkim Harmony
- Owner: Malaysia's Orkim Ship Management
- Port of registry: Malaysia
- Launched: 25 October 2008
- Homeport: Port Klang
- Identification: IMO number: 9524671; MMSI number: 533042200
- Status: In active service

General characteristics
- Type: Tanker
- Tonnage: 7,301 DWT; 5,081 GT
- Length: 106.65 m (349 ft 11 in) LOA
- Draught: 5m
- Speed: 10.4 knots (19.3 km/h; 12.0 mph)
- Crew: 22

MT Orkim Harmony is a Malaysia registered tanker.

== 2015 hijacking ==
On 11 June 2015, the ship was reportedly missing in the water of Tanjung Sedili, Kota Tinggi, Johor, Malaysia after being hijacked by eight Indonesian pirates armed with pistols and parangs. During the hijack, a crew of 22 was on board the tanker including 16 Malaysians, five Indonesians and one Myanmar national. The tanker was loaded with 6,000 metric tonnes of petrol worth around 21 million ringgit (US$5.6 million). The tanker was later recovered on 17 June with the help of Royal Australian Air Force and all the hostages been rescued by Royal Malaysian Navy, Royal Malaysian Air Force and Malaysian Maritime Enforcement Agency on 19 June. Eight pirates who hijacked the tanker were then captured by Vietnam Border Guard and Vietnam Coast Guard after they were found intruding the Vietnamese border in their bid to escape.
