= Bebuloh =

Village in Labuan, Malaysia

Coordinates: 5°16′52.1″N 115°12′42.8″E

Bebuloh is a small village in Labuan, Malaysia.
