= Plaza Low Yat =

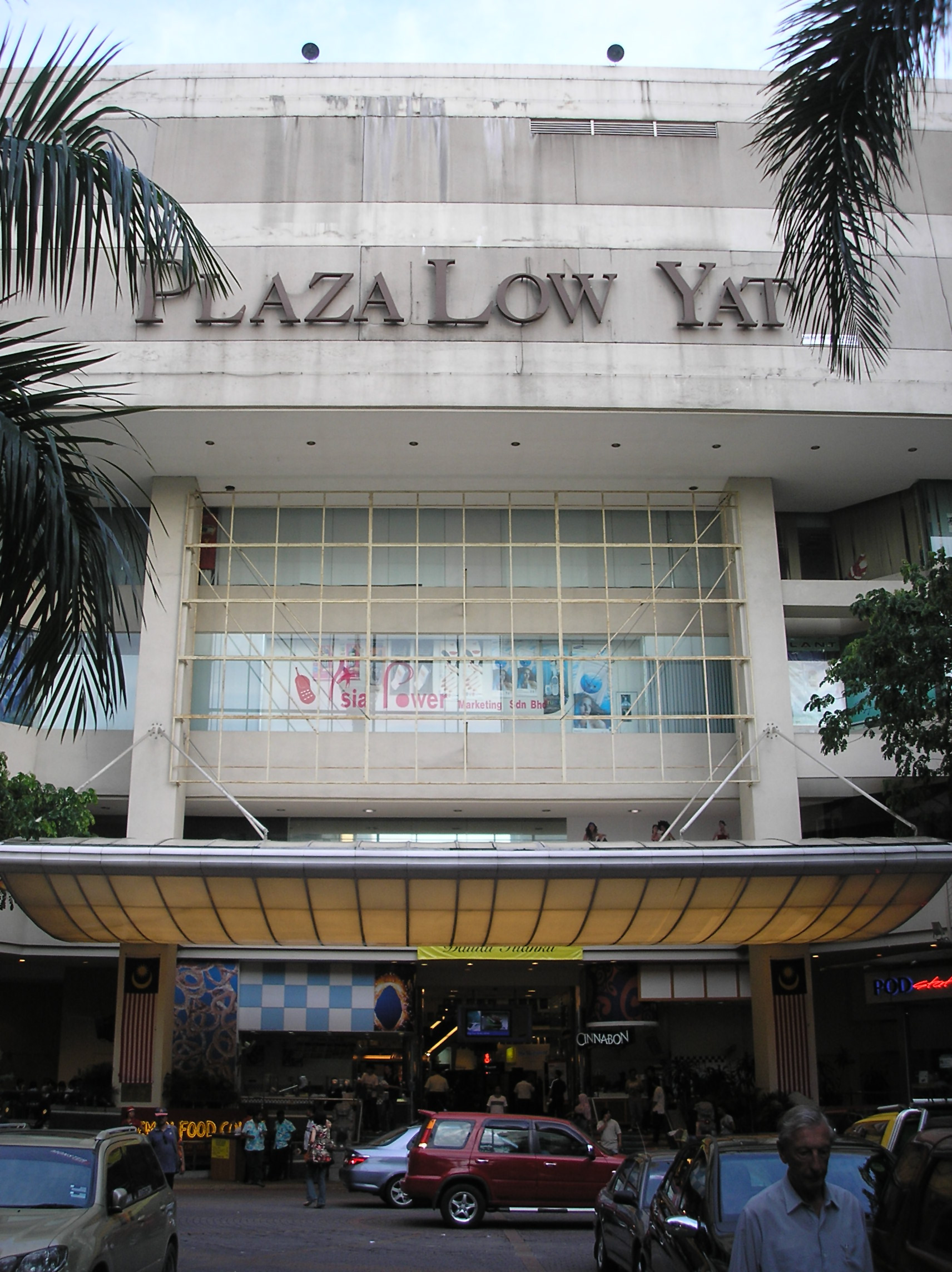
- The northern and main entrance of Plaza Low Yat
- Location: Imbi, Kuala Lumpur, Malaysia
- Coordinates: 3°8′38.44″N 101°42′37.80″E
- Opened: 1999
- Num. of stores: ~400
- Num. of anchor tenants: 2
- Floor area: 28,800 m^{2} (310,000 sq ft)
- Floors: 7
- Public transit: MR5 Imbi Monorail station
- Website: plazalowyat.com

Plaza Low Yat is a shopping centre specializing in electronics and IT products in Kuala Lumpur, Malaysia. In 2009, Plaza Low Yat was named “Malaysia’s Largest IT Lifestyle Centre” by the Malaysian Book of Records. Plaza Low Yat falls under the Low Yat Group, alongside other properties in the city centre such as Federal Hotel, Capitol Hotel, Federal Arcade and BBpark. Plaza Low Yat is widely regarded as the most comprehensive IT centre in Kuala Lumpur, offering various IT products and services from mobile, photography, and gaming, to computing and repairs. Each floor in the centre generally specializes in a particular group of IT products. The centre is notoriously known for the amount of haggling and price comparisons required in order to find good deals, as well as the availability of software and games at relatively cheap prices.

== Incident ==
=== 2015 Low Yat riot ===
The Plaza Low Yat was the site of a riot in 2015. Three people were injured including a reporter during the commotion. Police believed that the riot occurred following a fight involving seven men at Plaza Low Yat on 12 July 2015, over the alleged theft of a smartphone.

== Transportation ==
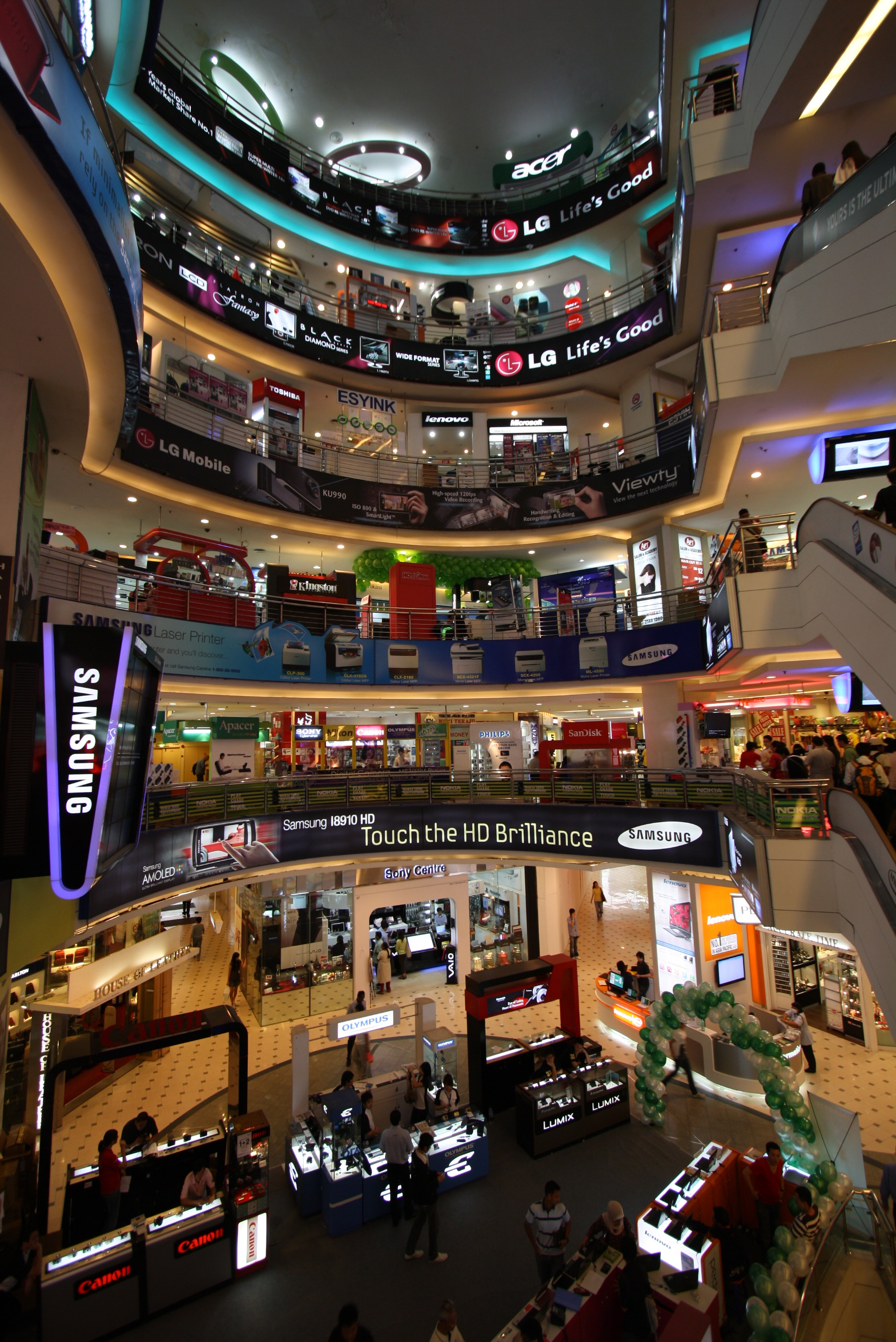
The interior of the shopping centre

The shopping centre is accessible within walking distance north of Imbi Station of KL Monorail and also southwest of Bukit Bintang MRT station.

== Accolades ==
- “Malaysia’s Largest IT Lifestyle Centre” by the Malaysia Book of Records (2019)

== See also ==
- List of shopping malls in Malaysia
