= Go KL City Bus =

Free bus service in Kuala Lumpur, Malaysia

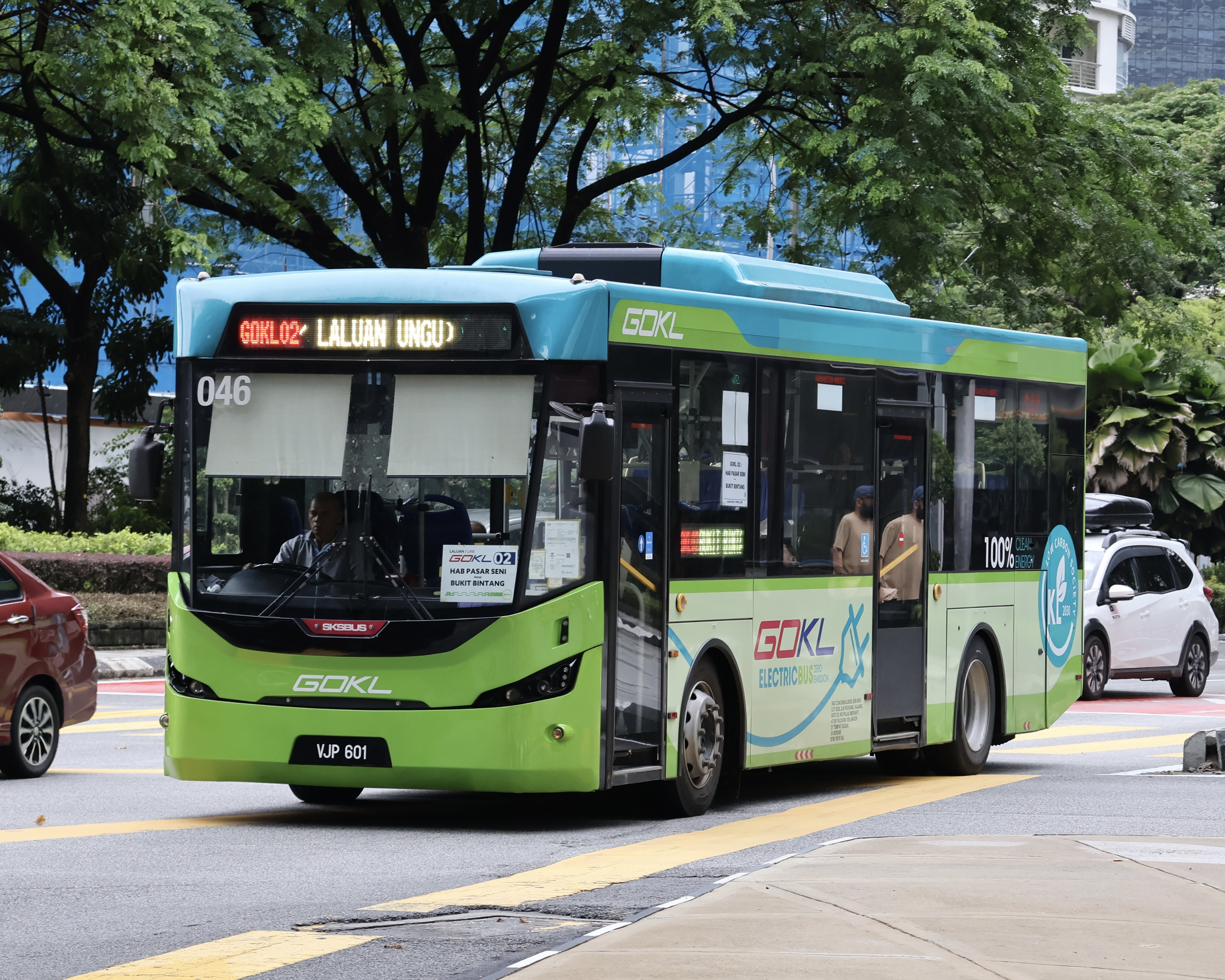
- SKSBus Electric Bus on route GOKL 02 at Raja Chulan station
- Parent: Kuala Lumpur City Hall
- Founded: 31 August 2012; 14 years ago
- Headquarters: Menara DBKL 1, Jalan Raja Laut, 50350 Kuala Lumpur, Malaysia
- Locale: Kuala Lumpur, Malaysia
- Service area: Federal Territory of Kuala Lumpur
- Service type: Free bus services
- Fleet: 80
- Daily ridership: 36,994 (2025) (▲22.4%)
- Annual ridership: 13.45 million (2025) (▲21.0%)
- Operator: SKS Coachbuilders Sdn Bhd (SKSBus)

Go KL City Bus (styled as GOKL CityBus) is a bus service in the city centre of Kuala Lumpur, Malaysia. Previously managed by Land Public Transport Commission (SPAD), the services were taken over by Kuala Lumpur City Hall (DBKL) by 1 January 2019.

== History ==
The free service were introduced by Land Public Transport Commission (SPAD) to help users save money by allowing them to move around Kuala Lumpur at no cost. Kuala Lumpur City Centre, Bukit Bintang and Chinatown areas are the first places to enjoy the service since it was launched on 31 August 2012 with 2 routes, namely the Purple and Green Lines.

On 1 May 2014, the free service has added new routes, namely Red and Blue Lines, covering Chow Kit, Kampung Baru, KL Sentral and Bukit Bintang, thus making four different circular city routes that can be identified by the colour of the routes.

By 1 January 2019, the service was taken over by Kuala Lumpur City Hall due to the termination of SPAD in 2018. Since then, the service now focuses on the feeder routes to help low-income users commute easily between residential areas and business centres or stations. The Orange Line was the first feeder route to be introduced on 28 February 2019, followed by the Pink Line in April 2019 and the Turquoise line in October 2019, all launched by Khalid Abdul Samad. The Maroon Line was introduced in August 2020, followed by the Chocolate Line in February 2021, both launched by Annuar Musa.

On 27 October 2021, it was announced by Shahidan Kassim that electric buses would be deployed in the bus services as a carbon reduction initiative and two new routes will be introduced, namely the Parrot Green and Grey lines. Both routes started operations in November 2021.

Open to residents and tourists, these services can be used at the GoKL City Bus official bus stop. Most bus stops are in close proximity to tourist attractions, major shopping centers, residential areas and easy way to connect through rail transit services such as KTM Komuter, Rapid KL and ERL.

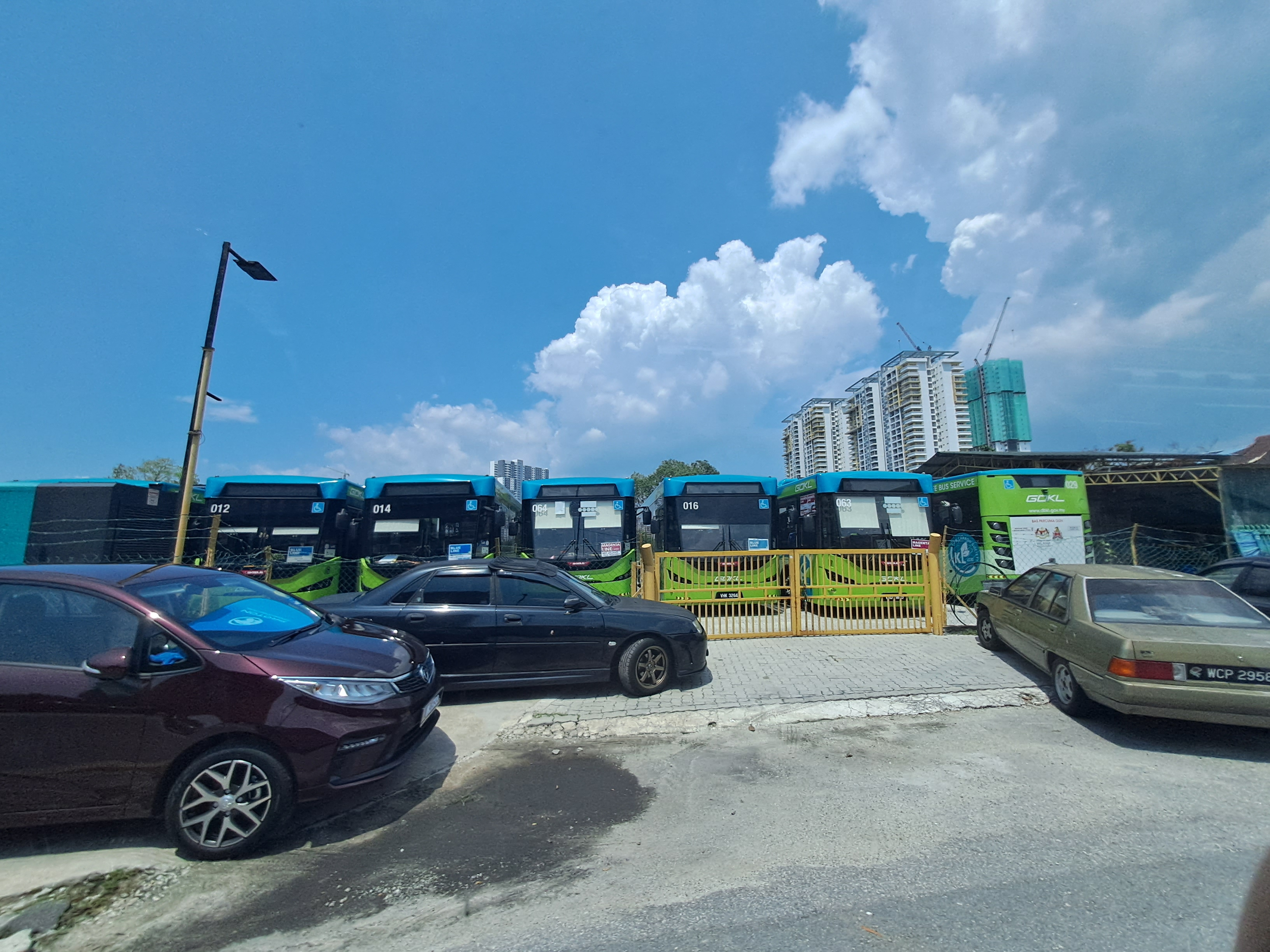
Go KL City Bus depot in Sentul, Kuala Lumpur

On 1 January 2024, the city hall announced the implementation of payments for foreign passengers for RM1 per ride for last-mile city routes. The payment can be made by using Touch n Go, credit and debit cards, however Malaysians are still able to get a free ride by using Malaysian National Registration Identity Card (NRIC).

== Bus routes ==
All buses make a circular one-way route clockwise based on Go KL route map. These routes are not parallel with the bus route with a fare such as Rapid KL buses to avoid competition on passenger load. Therefore, GoKL City Bus passengers are intended for travelling within the Central Business District (CBD) and residential areas, saving money and looking for a free ride.

To avoid complicated and confusion of using color names on the route, the City all changes the name of lines from the color name to route numbers starting 1 August 2023. The route number, however were currently combined with the color name to help regular passengers familiarize with the new implementation.

Phase	Line	Colour	Terminus			Introduced	Distance	Total stops	Connections	Ref.	District
1 (last mile)	GOKL 01	GREEN	KLCC	↺	Bukit Bintang	31 August 2012	7 km	15	5 KLCC; 8 9 Bukit Bintang MRT/Monorail; 8 Raja Chulan		Bukit Bintang; Titiwangsa
1 (last mile)	GOKL 02	PURPLE	Hab Pasar Seni	↺	Bukit Bintang	31 August 2012	6.3 km	15	5 9 Pasar Seni; 8 9 Bukit Bintang MRT/Monorail; 8 Raja Chulan		Bukit Bintang
1 (last mile)	GOKL 03	RED	Hab Titiwangsa	↺	KL Sentral	1 May 2014	13 km	23	3 4 8 12 Titiwangsa; 8 Chow Kit; 1 2 Kuala Lumpur; 9 Muzium Negara; 1 2 5 6 7 KL Sentral		Titiwangsa; Bukit Bintang
1 (last mile)	GOKL 04	BLUE	Hab Tititwangsa	↺	Bukit Bintang	1 May 2014	12 km	23	3 4 8 12 Titiwangsa; 8 Chow Kit; 5 Dang Wangi; 8 Bukit Nanas; 8 Raja Chulan; 8 9 Bukit Bintang MRT/Monorail		Titiwangsa; Bukit Bintang
2 (first mile)	GOKL 05	ORANGE	Hab Titiwangsa	↺	MINDEF	28 February 2019	10.4 km	24	3 4 8 12 Titiwangsa; 8 Chow Kit		Setiawangsa; Titiwangsa; Bukit Bintang
2 (first mile)	GOKL 06	PINK	LRT Universiti	↺	PPR Pantai Ria	1 April 2019	7.3 km	13	5 Universiti; 2 Angkasapuri		Lembah Pantai
2 (first mile)	GOKL 07	TURQUOISE	LRT Dato' Keramat	↺	Kelumpuk Bambu (Setiawangsa)	22 October 2019	10 km	20	5 Dato' Keramat; 5 Setiawangsa		Setiawangsa; Titiwangsa; Gombak (partial, out of DBKL jurisdiction)
2 (first mile)	GOKL 08	MAROON	KTM / MRT Kampung Batu	↺	Chow Kit	28 August 2020	20.3 km	49	3 4 Sentul; 1 12 Kampung Batu; 3 4 8 12 Titiwangsa; 8 Chow Kit		Batu; Bukit Bintang
2 (first mile)	GOKL 09	CHOCOLATE	LRT Sri Rampai	↺	Seksyen 10 Wangsa Maju	16 February 2021	13.0 km	32	5 Sri Rampai		Wangsa Maju; Setiawangsa
2 (first mile)	GOKL 10	PARROT GREEN	Terminal Maluri	↺	Bandar Sri Permaisuri	1 November 2021	13.8 km	35	3 9 Maluri; 4 Cheras		Cheras; Bandar Tun Razak
2 (first mile)	GOKL 11	GREY	MRT Cochrane	↺	Bandar Tun Razak	1 November 2021	16.7 km	34	9 Cochrane; 3 9 Maluri		Titiwangsa; Cheras; Bandar Tun Razak
2 (first mile)	GOKL 12	CREAM	Taman Fadason	↺	MRT Sri Delima	15 November 2022	15.7km	25	12 Jinjang; 12 Sri Delima		Kepong
2 (first mile)	GOKL 13	MAGENTA	MRT Jinjang	↺	MATRADE	15 November 2022	16 km	24	12 Jinjang; 2 Segambut; 2 Segambut Utara		Kepong; Segambut
2 (first mile)	GOKL 14	N/A	Kompleks Komuniti Muhibbah	↺	PPR Pinggiran Bukit Jalil	1 August 2023	18.9 km	30	4 Awan Besar; 4 Muhibbah		Seputeh
2 (first mile)	GOKL 15	N/A	Alam Damai	↺	H.U.K.M	25 January 2024	20.6 km	56	4 Bandar Tun Razak (Walking distance from Flat Sri Kota bus stop)		Bandar Tun Razak

== Fleet ==
=== Current ===
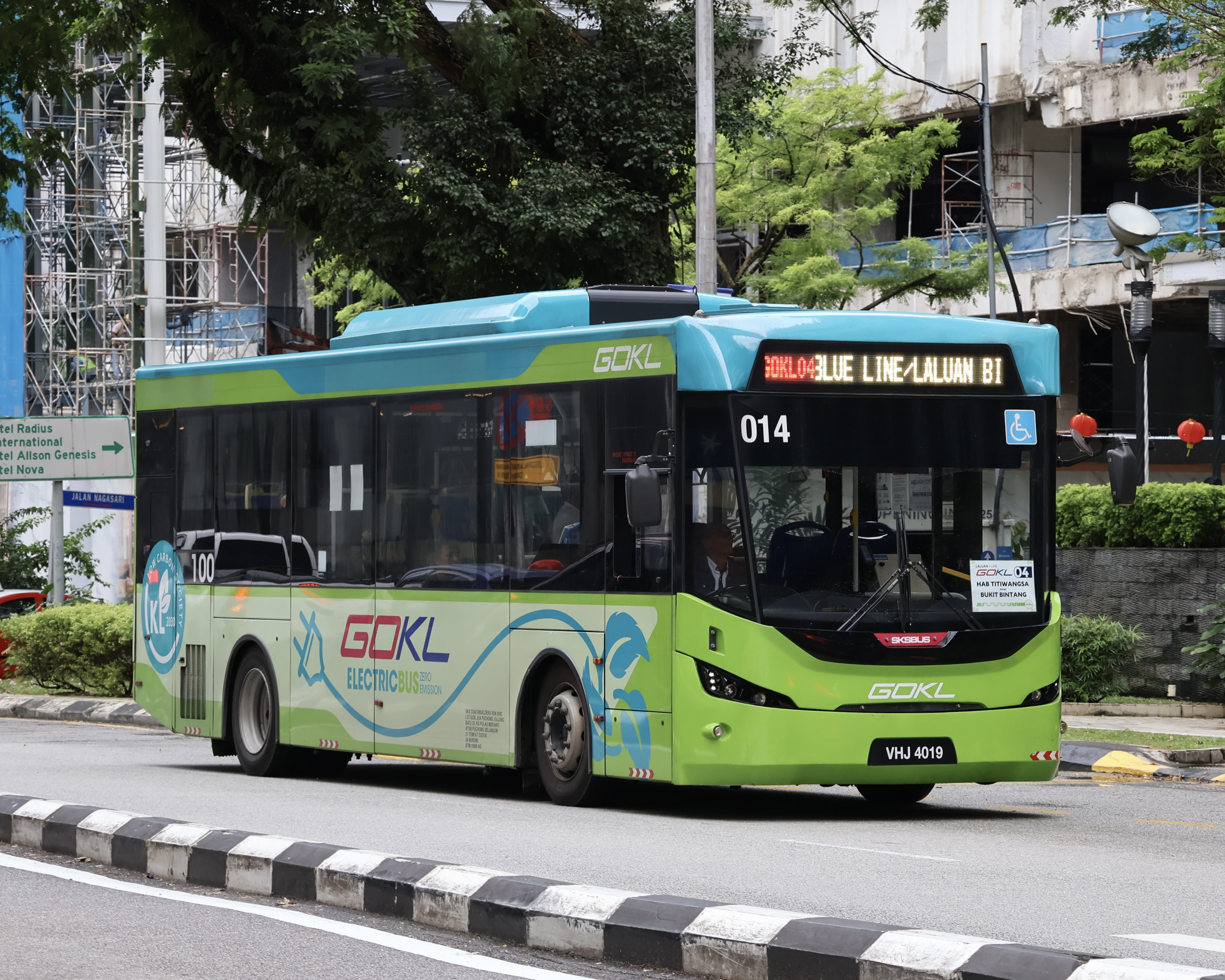
An SKSBus electric bus

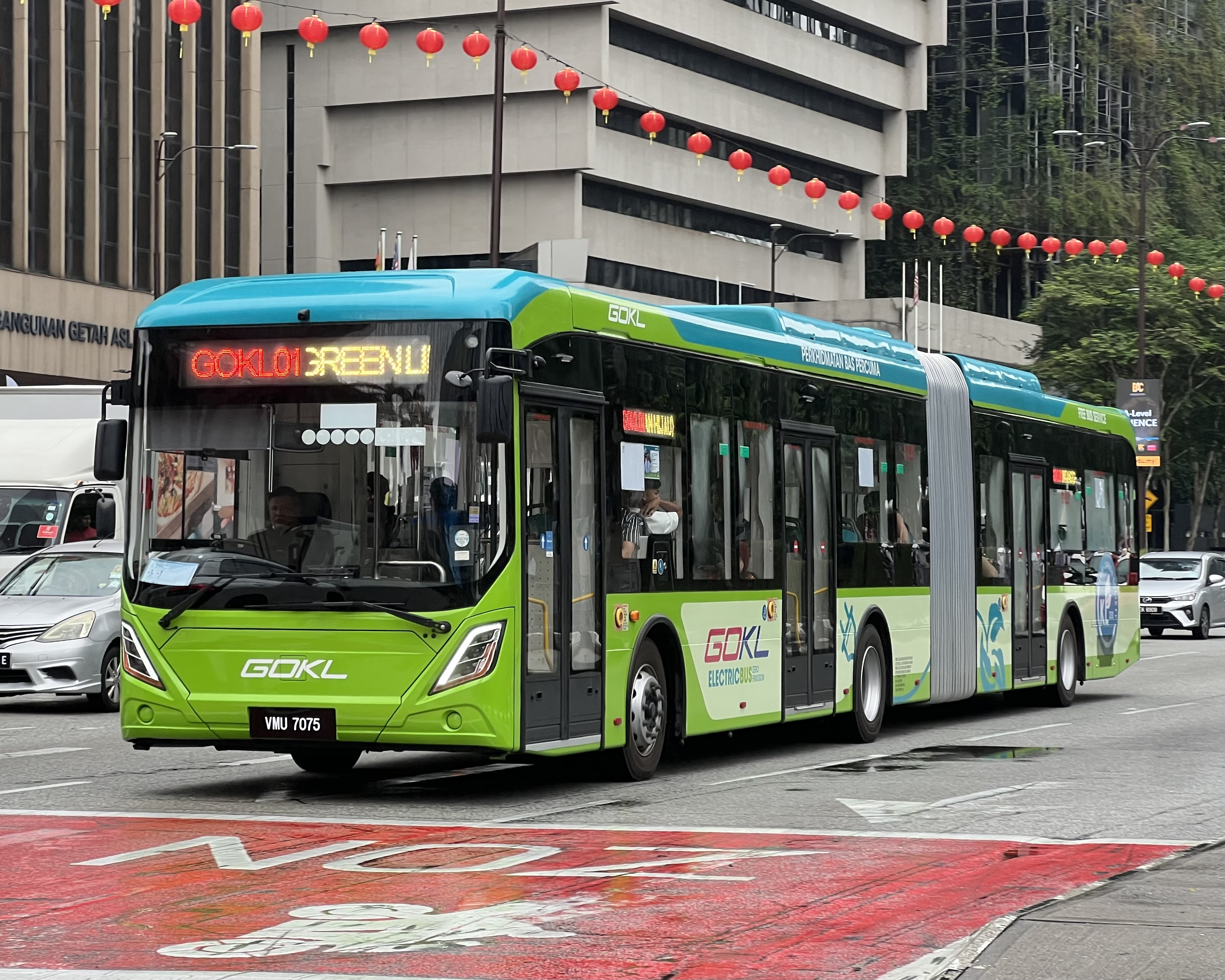
The CRRC C18 trial bus

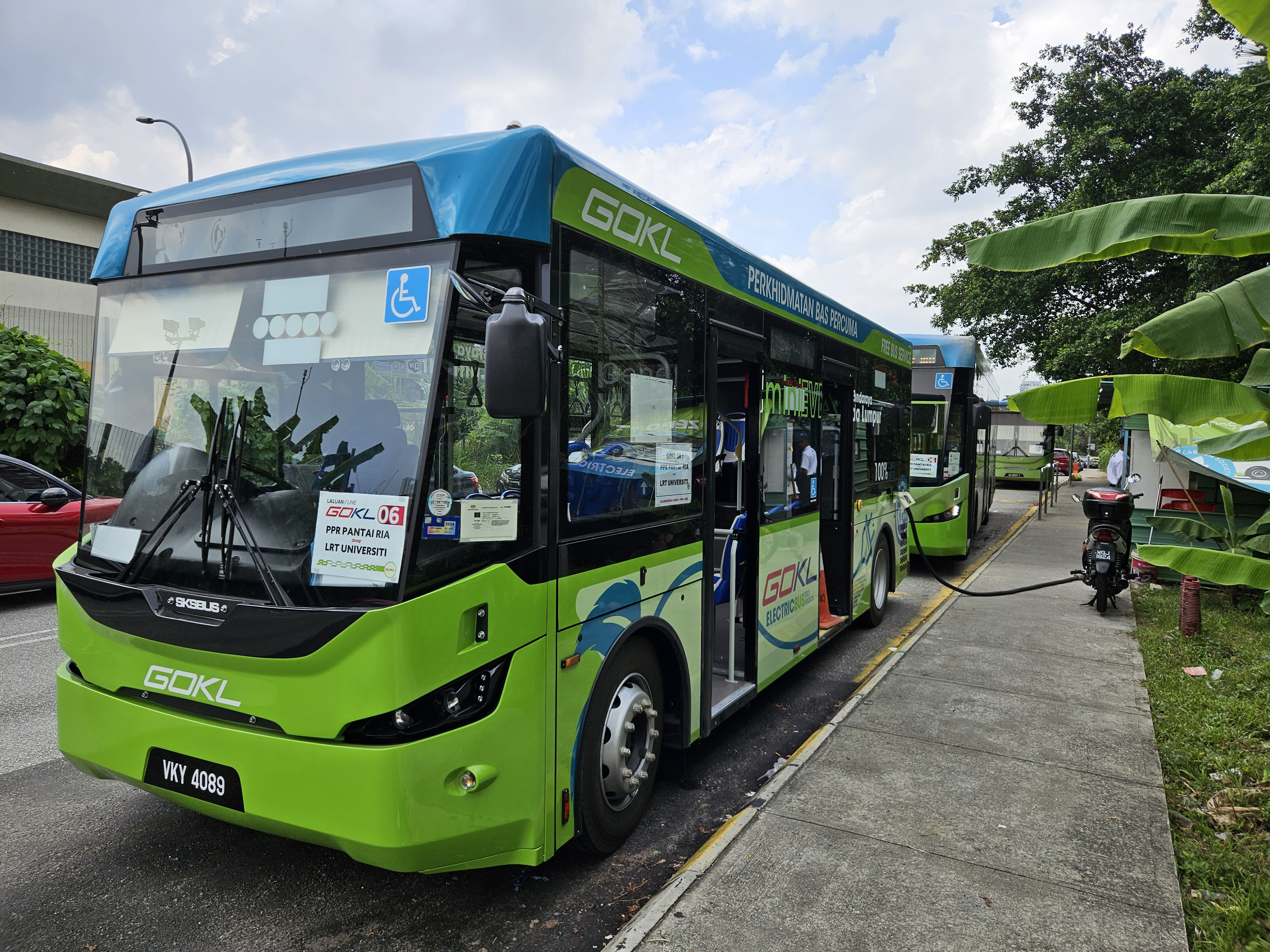
- SKSBus C3 Mini Electric Bus - A shorter version of the C3 EV used on majority of GOKL routes.
  SKSBus LEC-300H (SKSBus) - 6 buses (1 November 2021 - )
- SKSBus C3 Electric Bus (ELC-229EV) - 80 buses (1 November 2021 - )
- SKSBus C3 Mini Electric Bus - 6 buses (1 August 2023 - )
- CRRC C18 TEG6180BEV02 - 1 articulated bus (trial period - 1 January 2025 to 30 April 2025; now used on GOKL-03 from 1 August 2026)

Currently, the fleet consist of 80 SKS ELC-229EV electric bus, managed by SKSBus. The buses were painted with green and turquoise colour in line with the new DBKL initiative for a greener mode of transportation. The SKS ELC-229EV Electric Bus entered service on 1 November 2021 on the Chocolate Line.

In addition to normal electric bus fleets, GOKL also provided an articulated bus which was on trial period from 1 January 2025 to 30 April 2025.

=== Former ===
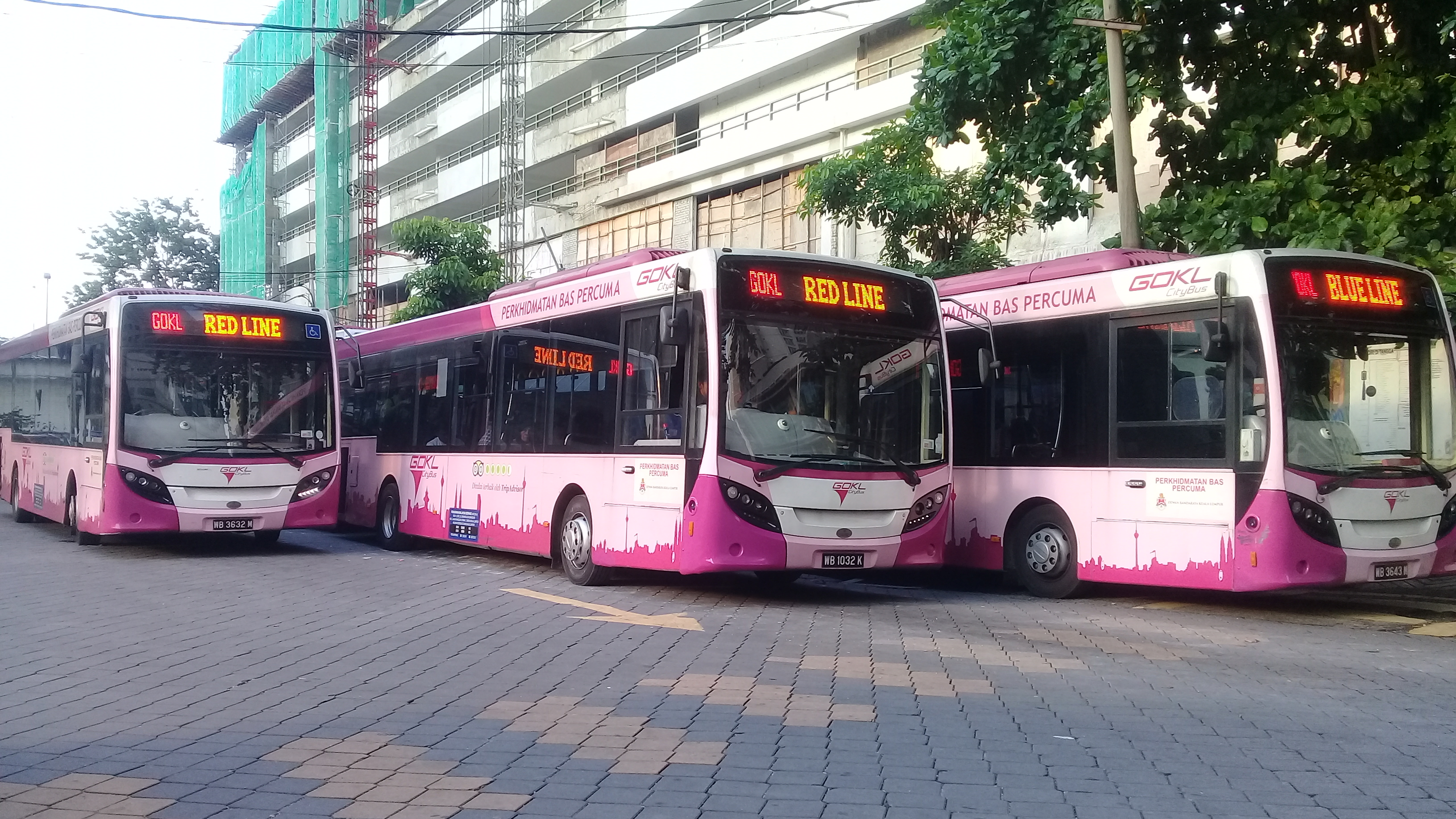
Alexander Dennis Enviro200 in the former livery

- King Long XMQ6121G (Rapid KL) - 20 buses (31 August 2012 - 31 July 2015)
- Daewoo BV120MA (CityLiner) - 20 buses (1 May 2014 - 31 July 2015)
- Scania K250UB (Rapid KL) - 40 buses (1 August 2015 - 31 October 2021)
- Alexander Dennis Enviro200 (Rapid KL) - 20 buses (1 August 2015 - 1 May 2021)
- Scania K270UB (Rapid KL) - 20 buses (28 August 2020 - 31 October 2021)
- Yutong ZK6126HG (Handal Indah) - 40 buses (1 November 2021 - 15 January 2022)
- Higer KLQ6128 (UNICLeisure TransTour) - 20 buses (1 February 2022 - 30 April 2022)

Previously, the fleet consisted of King Long XMQ6121G buses from Rapid KL for the Green and Purple Lines, and Daewoo BV120MA NGV buses from Konsortium Transnasional for the Red and Blue Lines, painted in purple and pink livery. These buses were replaced on 1 August 2015 with Scania K-series and Alexander Dennis Enviro200 buses. Usually, the Enviro200 buses served the Blue and Red Lines, the Scania K270 buses served the Maroon and Chocolate Lines, and the Scania K250 buses served the rest, though the Scania K250 buses would also serve the other lines during rush hours. The buses were used until 31 October 2021, where all GoKL operations were transferred to Causeway Link and SKSBus. All the buses were returned to the respective operators and repainted to be redeployed on normal services.

== Operation hours and bus frequency ==
Monday to Sunday: 6.00am - 11.00pm

Frequency of bus:-

- Last mile (city route)
  - Peak hour (working day only) - 5 minutes
  - Off-peak hour - 15 minutes
- First mile (feeder route)
  - Peak hour (working day only) - 15 minutes
  - Off-peak hour - 30 minutes

== See also ==
- List of free public transport routes (Worldwide)
- Free public transport
- Free travel pass
