= Bukit Bintang station =

Bukit Bintang station may refer to:

- Bukit Bintang Monorail station, part of the KL Monorail in Bukit Bintang
- Bukit Bintang MRT station, part of the MRT Kajang Line in Bukit Bintang, sponsored by Pavilion Kuala Lumpur
