= Imbi station =

Monorail station Kuala Lumpur, Malaysia

MR5 Imbi
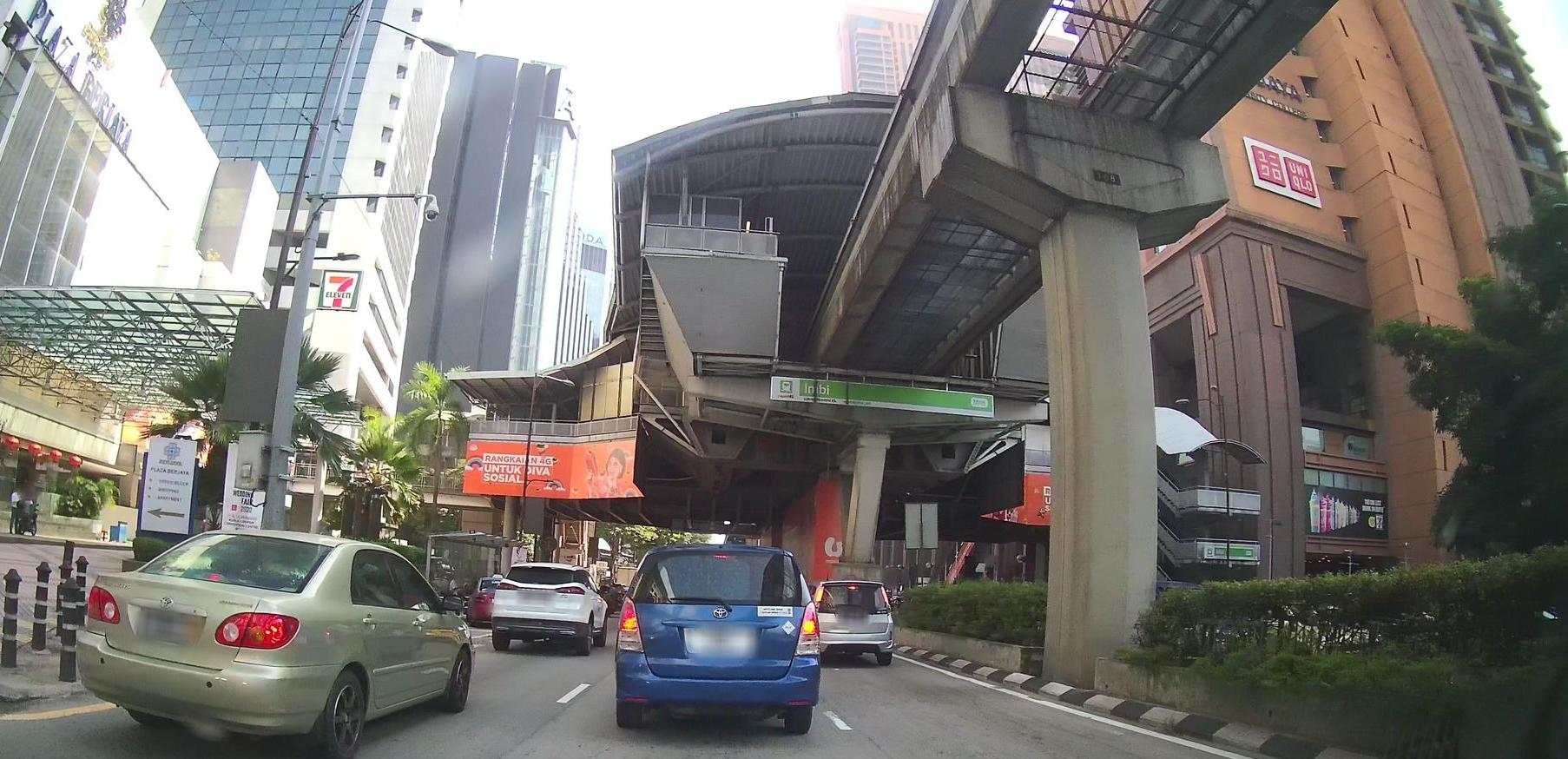
- The exterior of the Imbi station, as seen towards the northwest.

General information
- Other names: Malay: ايمبي (Jawi); Chinese: 燕美; Tamil: இம்பி
- Location: Jalan Imbi, Imbi, 55100 Kuala Lumpur; Malaysia
- Coordinates: 3°8′34″N 101°42′33″E
- System: Rapid KL
- Owner: Prasarana Malaysia
- Operator: Rapid Rail
- Line: 8 KL Monorail
- Platforms: 2 side platforms
- Tracks: 2

Construction
- Structure type: Elevated
- Parking: Not available
- Cycle facilities: Not available
- Accessible: Available

Other information
- Station code: MR5

History
- Opened: 31 August 2003; 22 years ago

Services
Preceding station		Following station
Hang Tuah towards Kuala Lumpur Sentral	KL Monorail	Bukit Bintang Monorail towards Titiwangsa
Location

Imbi station is a Malaysian elevated monorail train station on the Kuala Lumpur Monorail line (KL Monorail), located in Kuala Lumpur and opened for train service on 31 August 2003. The station is located in close proximity to the Bukit Bintang shopping district.

== Location ==
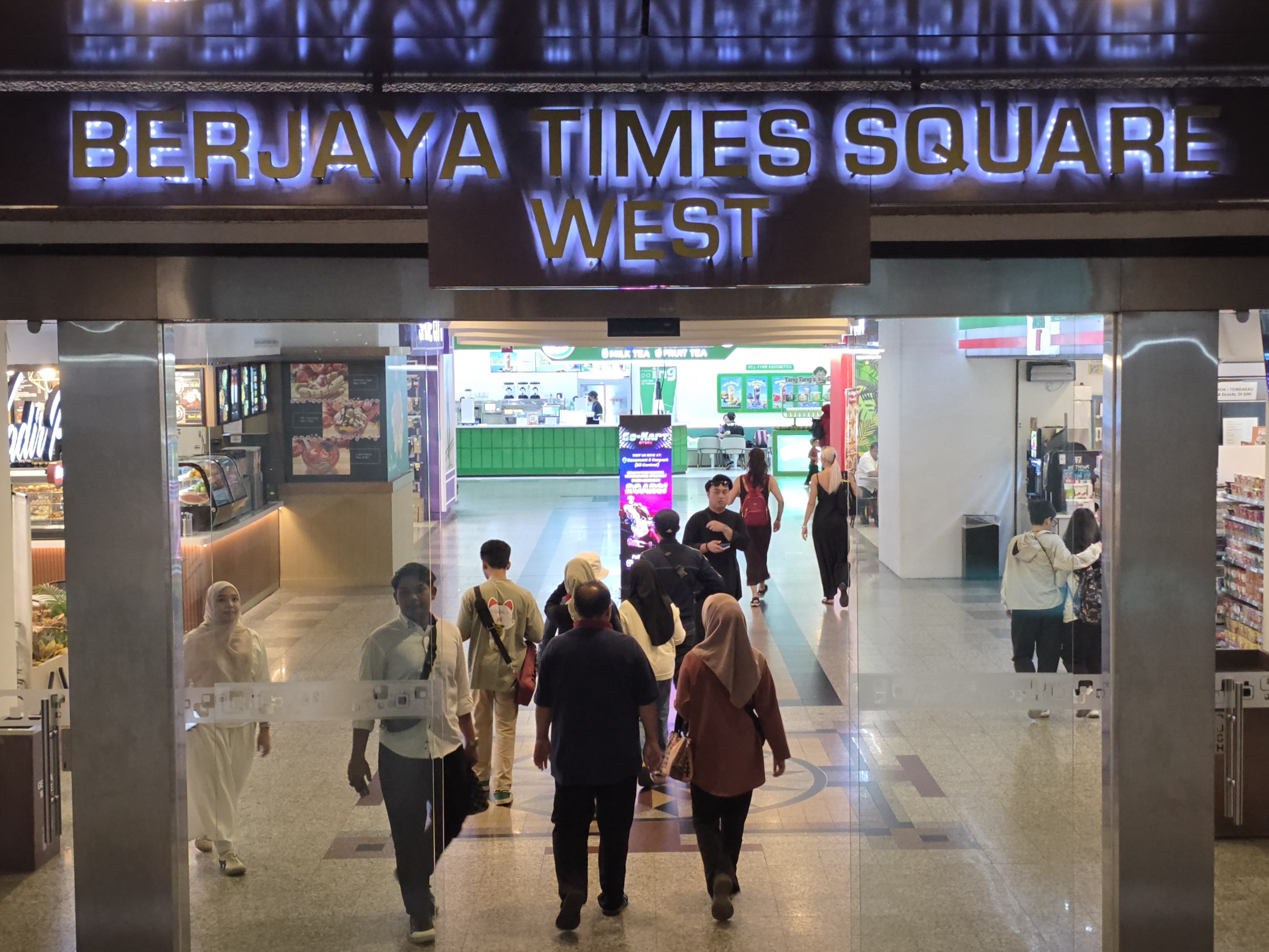
Entrance E of Imbi station, connecting passengers to Berjaya Times Square

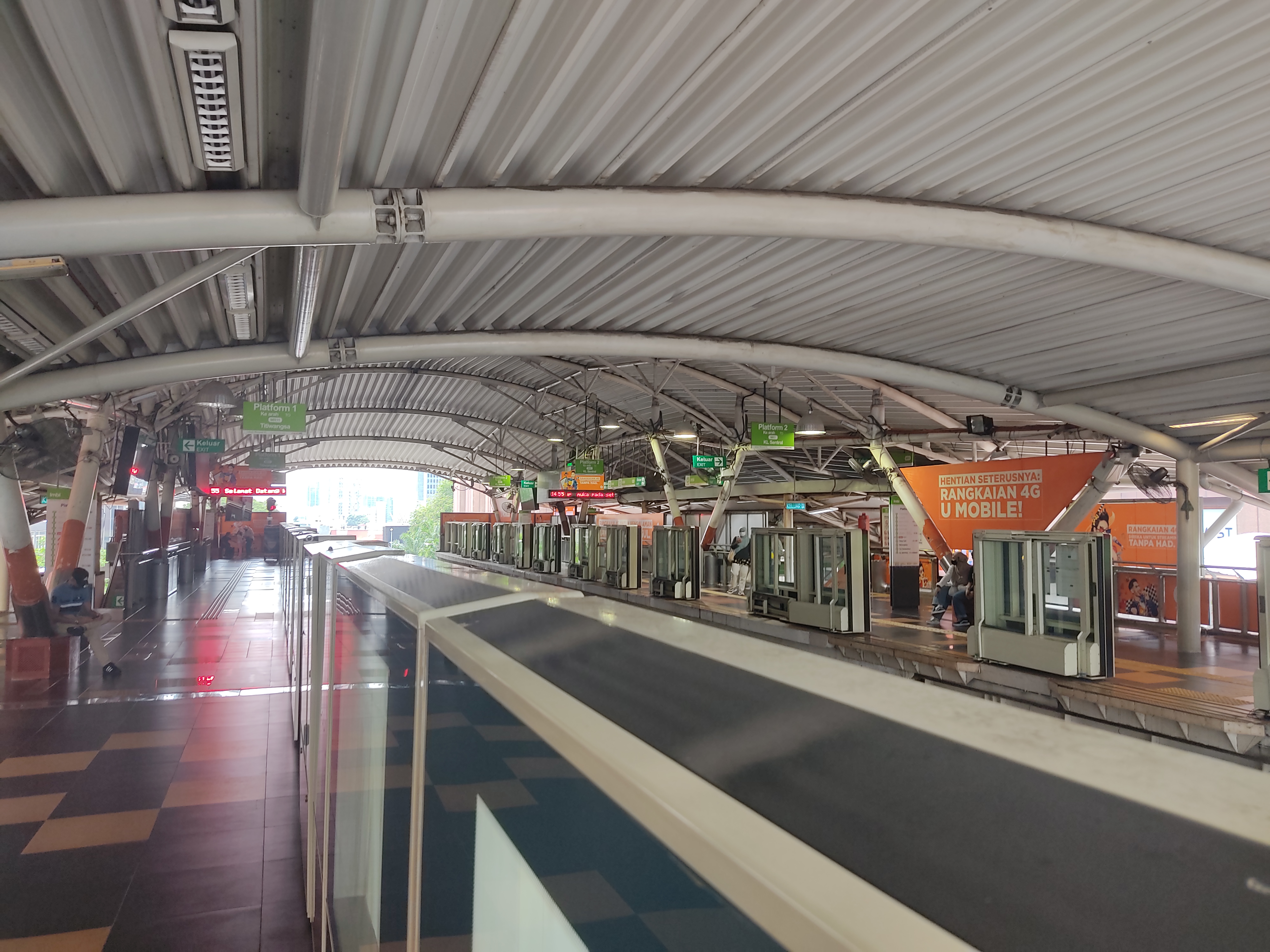
Platform level view

The station is situated in and named after the district of Imbi, directly over Jalan Imbi (English: Imbi Road) beside the northeast tip of the Berjaya Times Square shopping center and just east of Plaza Berjaya. Berjaya Times Square was opened two months after the station began operation. The station features a total of five exits: Two exits towards the west of the station lead into Berjaya Times Square and Plaza Berjaya on the opposite side of the road, while the remaining two exits lead eastward onto both sides of Jalan Imbi.

The station is one of four KL Monorail stations that serves the Kuala Lumpur Golden Triangle locality, the other three being Raja Chulan, the Bukit Bintang and Hang Tuah stations.

The Imbi Monorail station is also within a close range of several more shopping centers near Bukit Bintang, including Low Yat Plaza, Imbi Plaza, Sungei Wang Plaza, and Pavilion Kuala Lumpur. Because of its location, the station receives a high number of passengers during peak hours and non-working days, although there is no bus connection to this station.

== Layout ==
=== Station layout plan ===
L2	Station Platform Level & Staircase Linkway	Side platform
L2	Station Platform Level & Staircase Linkway	Platform 1 8 KL Monorail towards MR11 Titiwangsa (→)
L2	Station Platform Level & Staircase Linkway	Platform 2 8 KL Monorail towards MR1 KL Sentral (←)
L2	Station Platform Level & Staircase Linkway	Side platform
L1	Station Concourse	Faregates, Ticketing Machines, Monorail Station Control, Concourse Staircase Linkway, Unpaid Area Escalator to/from Street Level
L1	Linkway	Pedestrian Linkway
G	Street Level	Jalan Imbi, Taxi Lay-by, Pedestrian Crossing

== See also ==
- List of rail transit stations in Klang Valley
