= Berjaya Times Square =

Skyscraper complex in Kuala Lumpur, Malaysia

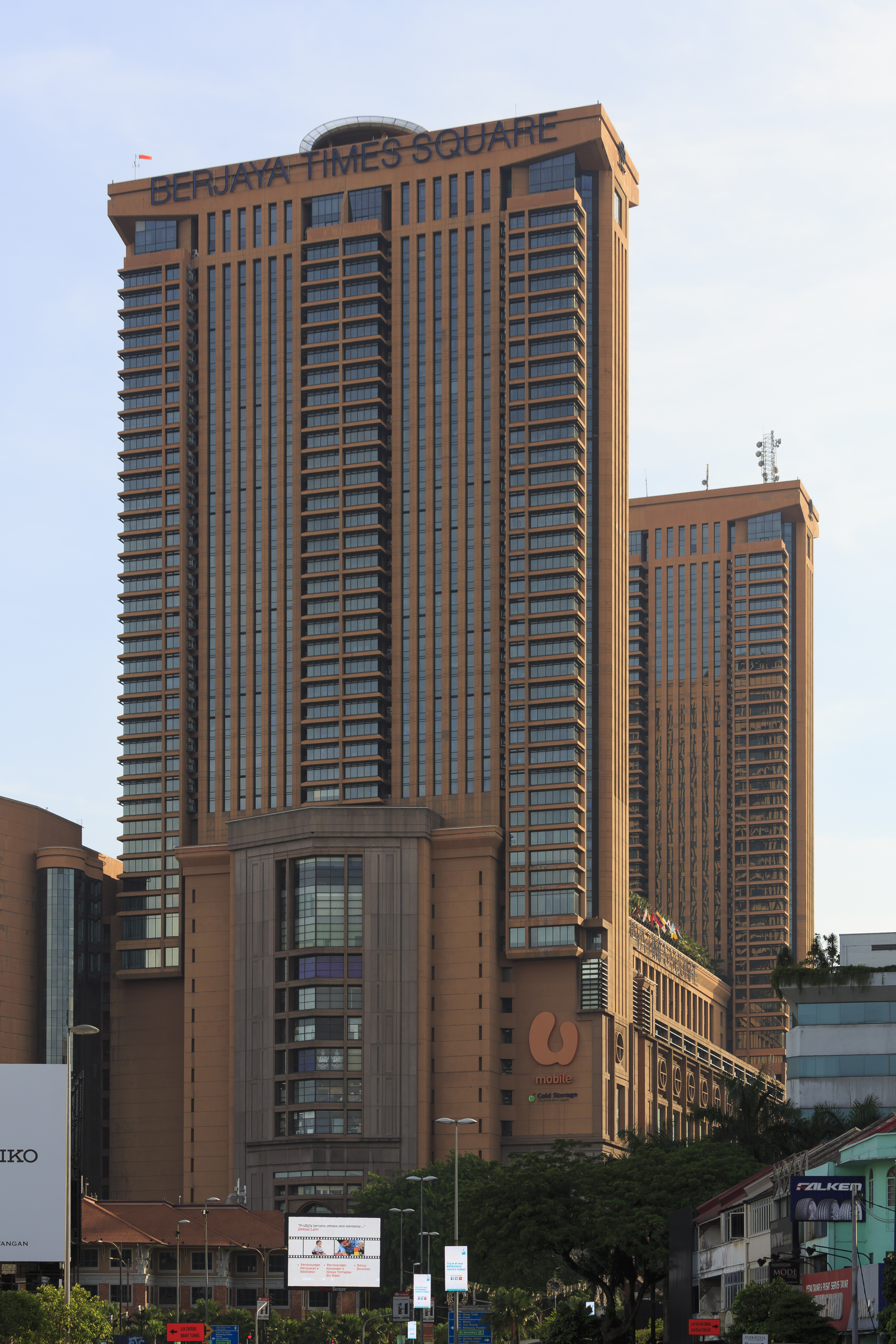
- Berjaya Times Square Kuala Lumpur, as seen at the Jalan Pudu-Jalan Imbi junction.

General information
- Status: Completed
- Type: Residential; Hotel
- Architectural style: Postmodernism
- Location: 1 Jalan Imbi; Kuala Lumpur, Malaysia
- Coordinates: 3°08′31.9″N 101°42′38.2″E
- Construction started: 1997; 29 years ago
- Completed: 2003; 23 years ago
- Opened: 29 September 2003; 23 years ago

Height
- Roof: 203 m (666 ft)

Technical details
- Floor count: 49 (Tower A); 48 (Tower B); 19 (Mall area)
- Lifts/elevators: 31

Design and construction
- Architect: DP Architects

Other information
- Public transit: MR5 Imbi Monorail station

Berjaya Times Square Kuala Lumpur
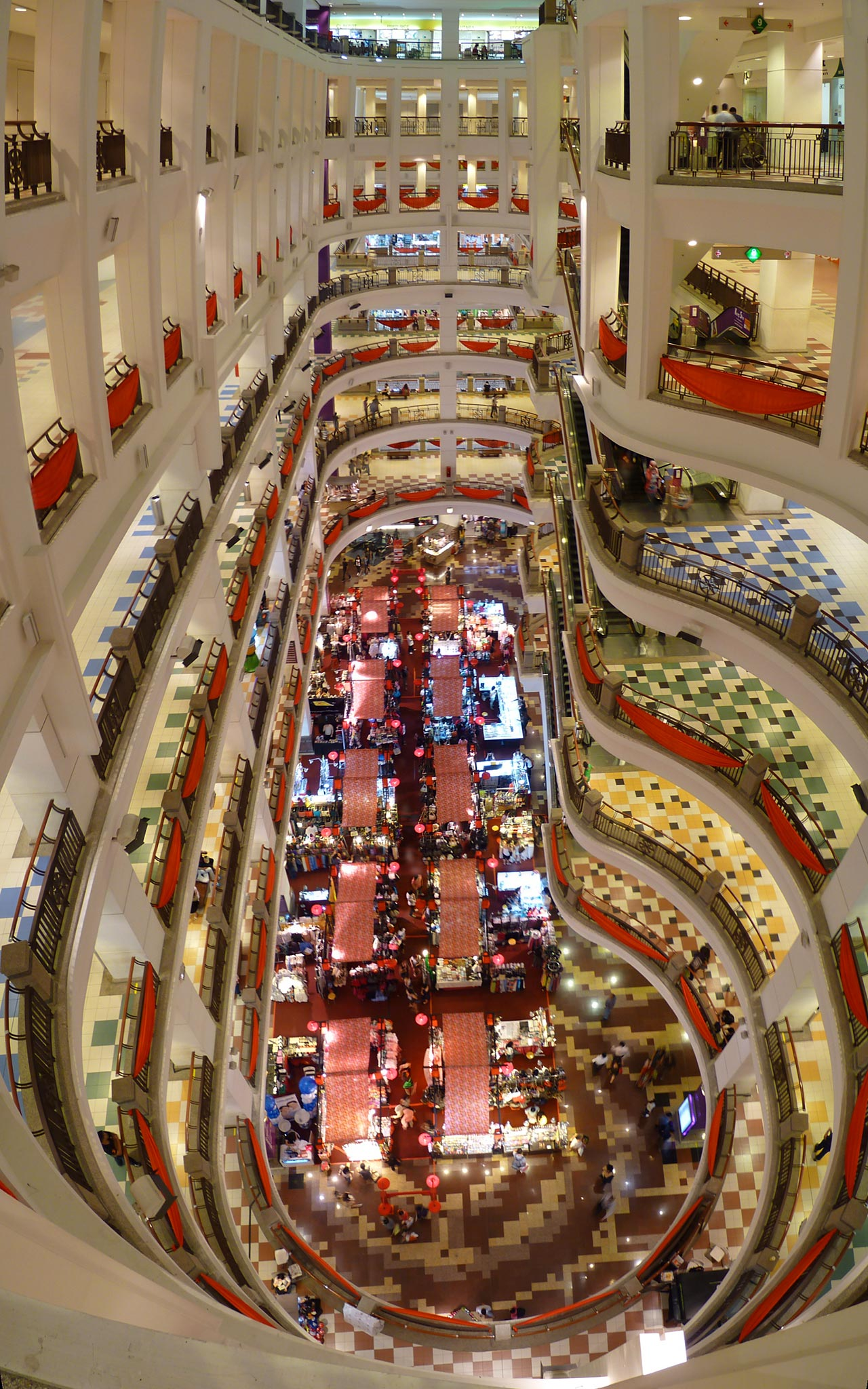
- Main atrium of Berjaya Times Square, Kuala Lumpur shopping mall in Feb 2011.
- Location: Imbi, Kuala Lumpur, Malaysia
- Opened: 29 September 2003; 23 years ago
- Developer: Berjaya Group
- Manager: Berjaya Times Square Management Corporation (BTSMC)
- Owner: Berjaya Group
- Architect: DP Architects
- Num. of stores: > 1,000
- Num. of anchor tenants: 6 (Including NSK Grocer, MM Cineplexes, Ampang Superbowl, F.O.S, Panda Eyes Department Store and Berjaya Times Square Theme Park)
- Floor area: 700,000 m^{2} (7,500,000 sq ft)
- Floors: 13
- Parking: ~4,300 parking bays
- Public transit: MR5 Imbi Monorail station
- Website: www.berjayatimessquarekl.com

Berjaya Times Square is a 48-storey, 203 m (666 ft) twin tower, comprising a hotel, condominium, indoor amusement park, commercial offices and shopping centre complex in Bukit Bintang, Kuala Lumpur, Malaysia. It was opened to the public in 2003.

== Background ==
The development is currently the tenth largest building in the world by floor area and has also been tagged as the "world's largest building ever built in a single phase," with 700,000 m^{2} (7,500,000 sq ft) of built up floor area. This building consists of a 19-storey shopping mall, business offices and leisure centre with over 1,000 retail shops, 1,200 luxury service suites, 65 food outlets and entertainment attractions such as the Berjaya Times Square Theme Park.

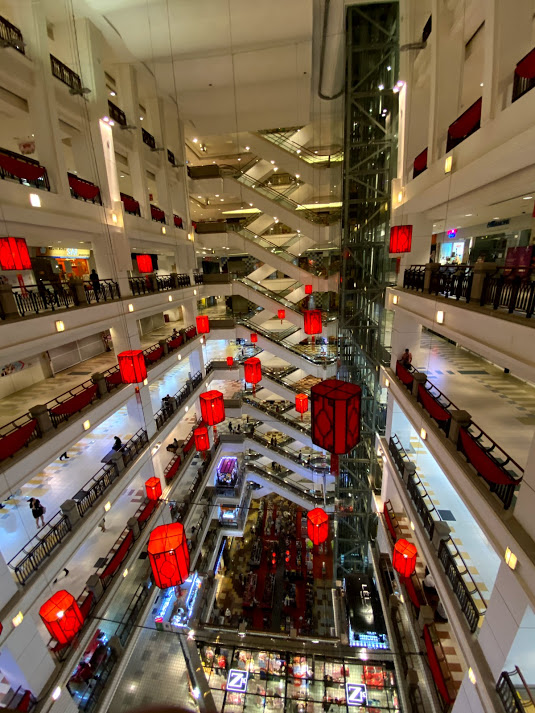
12-storey floor of retail area inside of Berjaya Times Square shopping mall

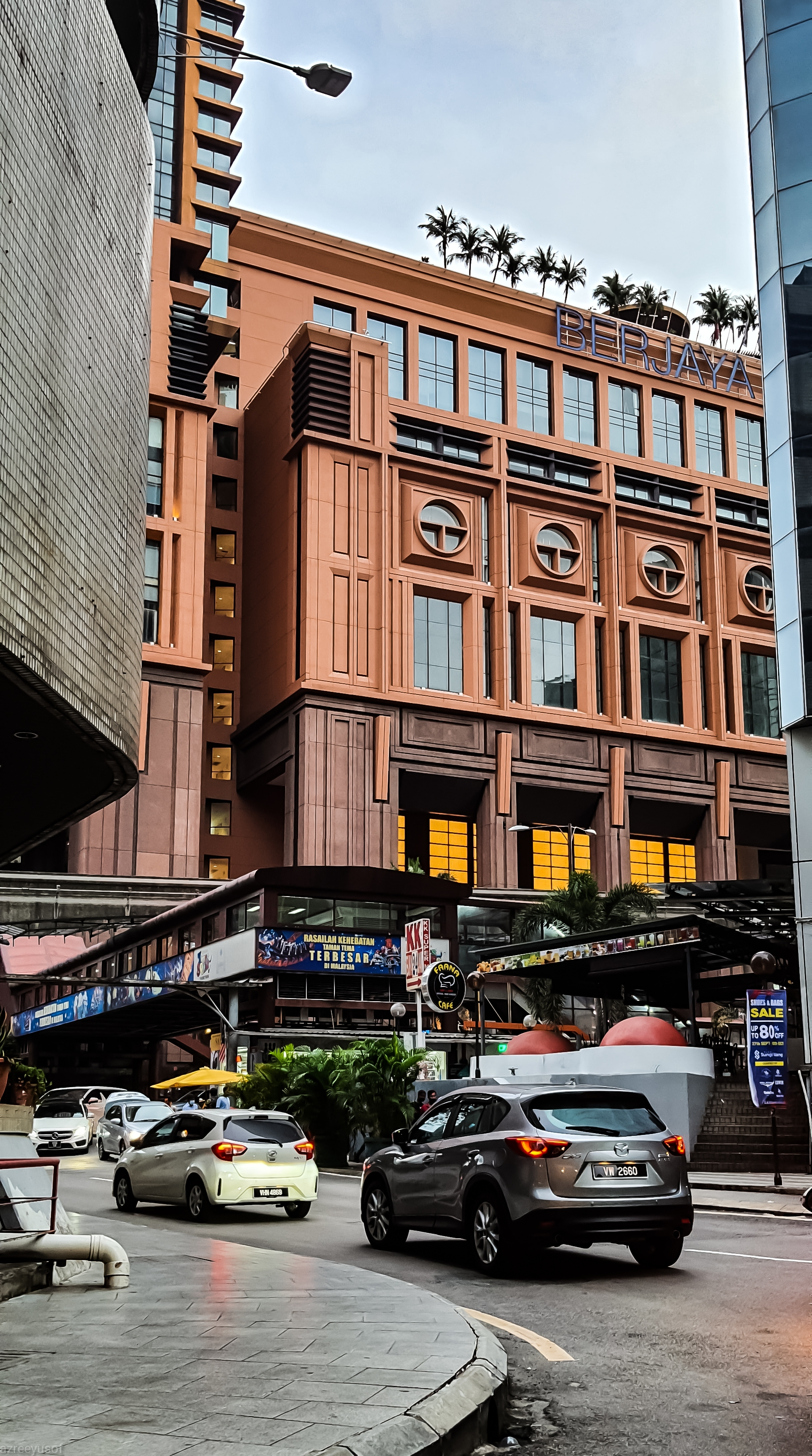
Berjaya Times Square as seen from Jalan Bulan

== History ==
Initially, the land belonged to the millionaire and philanthropist Cheong Yoke Choy before World War II. His bungalow stood there until the entire parcel of land was purchased by the Berjaya Group of Tan Sri Vincent Tan for the development of the current Berjaya Times Square.

Berjaya Times Square was officially opened by then-Prime Minister Mahathir Mohamad on 29 September 2003. It was supposed to be opened in 1999 but delayed due to the 1997 Asian financial crisis.

Debenhams opened its first store in Asia on 17 November 2003.

In April 2005, Borders opened its first franchise store here, which was the largest Borders store in the world at the time. However, due to the Great Recession, it was then been downsized into a smaller operation called Borders Express. However in 2016, it closed its doors permanently.

Its current anchor tenants include NSK Grocer, MM Cineplexes, Ampang Superbowl, F.O.S, Panda Eyes Department Store and Berjaya Times Square Theme Park.

== Transportation ==
The shopping centre is accessible within walking distance north of Imbi Station of KL Monorail and also southwest of Bukit Bintang MRT station.

== See also ==
- List of the world's largest shopping malls
- List of tallest buildings in Kuala Lumpur
- Bukit Bintang City Centre (BBCC)
