= Lot 10 =

Shopping mall in Bukit Bintang, Kuala Lumpur, Malaysia

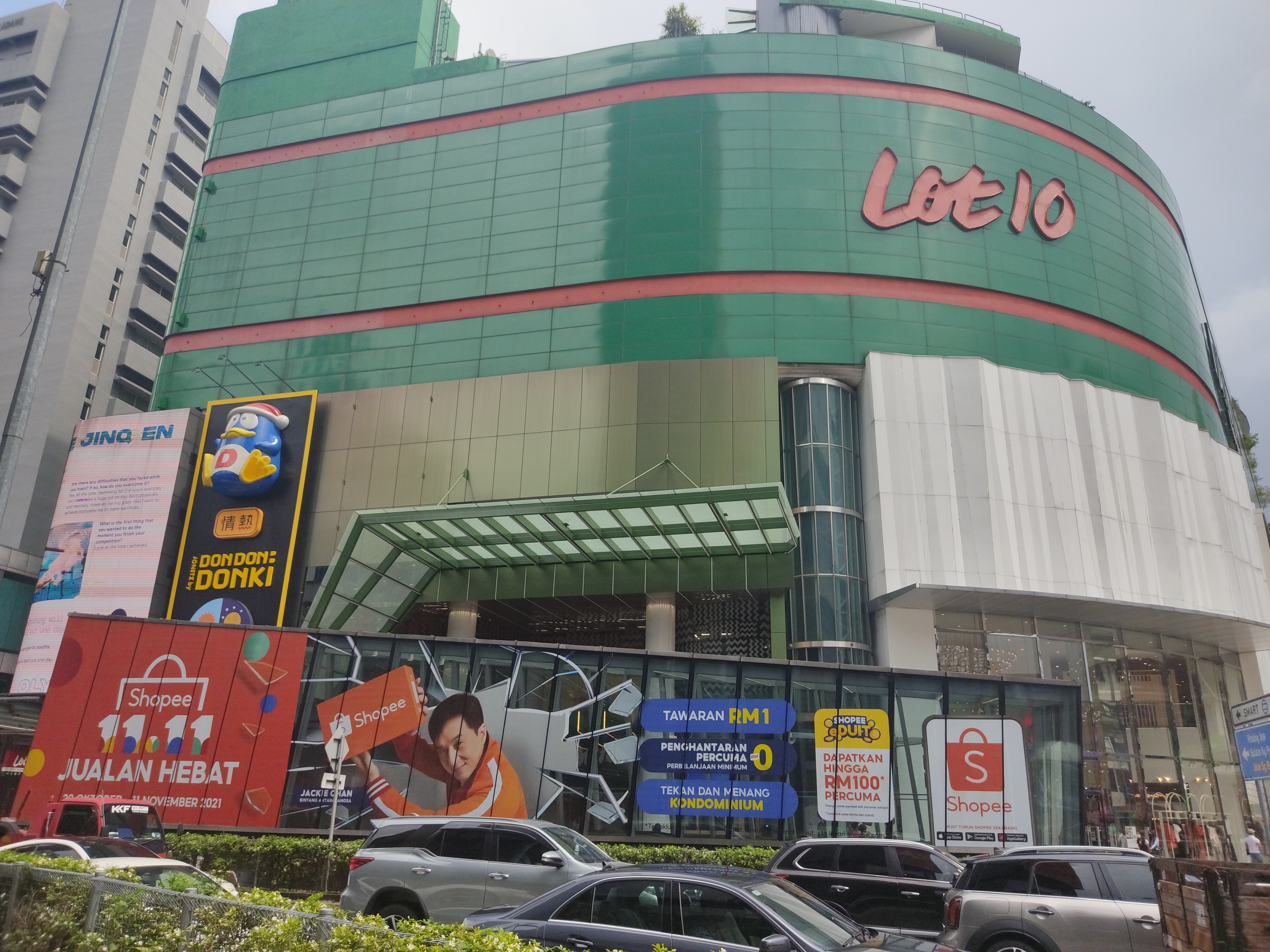
- Outer view of Lot 10 shopping mall from Bukit Bintang Road
- Location: Bukit Bintang, Kuala Lumpur, Malaysia
- Coordinates: 3.146301°N 101.711973°E
- Opened: 1990
- Manager: YTL Land
- Owner: YTL Land & Isetan of Japan
- Floors: 5 + lower ground
- Public transit: KG18A Pavilion Kuala Lumpur–Bukit Bintang MRT station MR6 Bukit Bintang Monorail station
- Website: lot10.com.my

Lot 10 is a shopping mall in Bukit Bintang, Kuala Lumpur, Malaysia. It opened in 1990 and houses tenants such as Jonetz by Don Don Donki, H&M, and Isetan.

== History ==
The construction of Lot 10 began in June 1988 and was expected to be completed in late 1989.

The initial owner of Lot 10 was Mayang Sari Sdn Bhd. The projected annual gross income on its first year was RM 17.2 million.

One of its first tenants was Isetan, which had already opened its first Malaysian outlet in 1988.

Lot 10 had the most property transactions among shopping centres in Kuala Lumpur "since end-1988", thanks to its prime location and good rental returns at RM 16 million per year, with over 186,450 square feet (17,322 m^{2}) of space sold for RM 804 per square feet.

As of 1996, the owner of Lot 10 was Taiping Consodilated Berhad, which also owned Starhill Mall.
