= Pavilion Kuala Lumpur =

Shopping mall in Kuala Lumpur, Malaysia

Pavilion KL
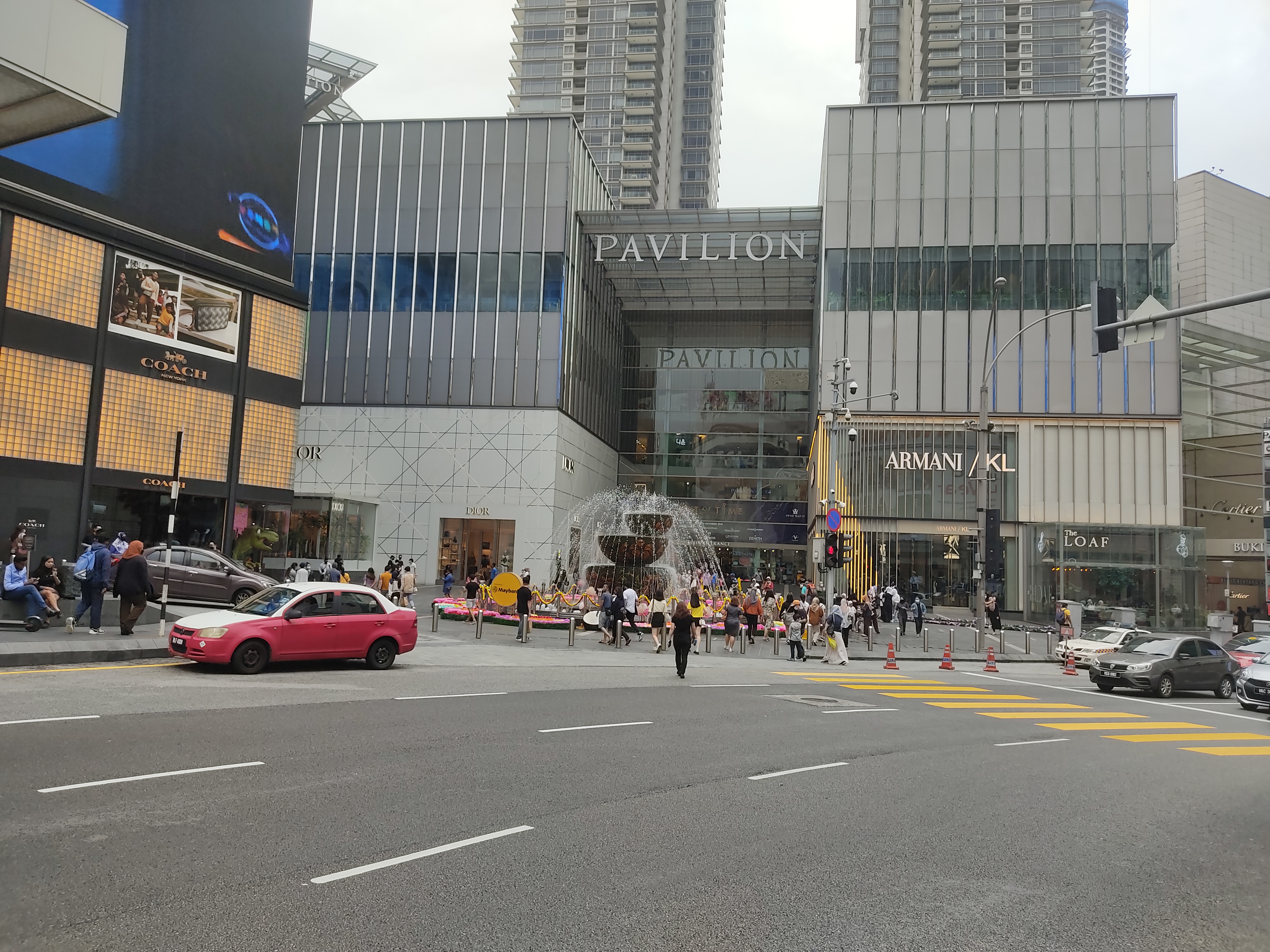
- Pavilion KL in 2021
- Location: Bukit Bintang, Kuala Lumpur, Malaysia
- Coordinates: 3.149215°N 101.713529°E
- Opened: 20 September 2007 (Phase 1, Pavilion Kuala Lumpur); 9 December 2016 (Phase 2, Pavilion Elite)
- Developer: Urusharta Cemerlang (KL) Sdn Bhd
- Owner: MTrustee Berhad for Pavilion REIT
- Num. of stores: 532
- Floor area: 1,610,000 sq ft (150,000 m^{2})
- Floors: 7 (Pavilion Shopping Centre); 10 (Pavilion Elite); 3 (Basements)
- Public transit: KG18A Bukit Bintang MRT station MR6 Bukit Bintang Monorail station
- Website: www.pavilion-kl.com

Pavilion Kuala Lumpur, also known as Pavilion KL, is a shopping centre situated in the Bukit Bintang district in Kuala Lumpur, Malaysia.

== History ==
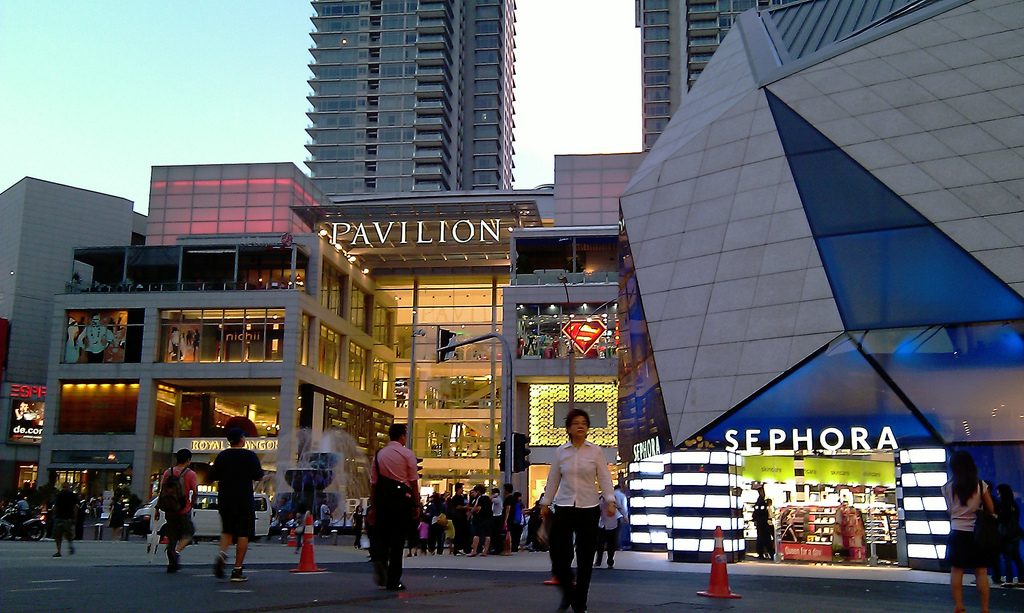
Pavilion KL before the refurbishment of its exterior

Pavilion Kuala Lumpur was built on the former site of Bukit Bintang Girls' School, the oldest school in Kuala Lumpur, which was moved to Cheras as Sekolah Seri Bintang Utara in 2000. Opened on 20 September 2007, the development consists of a premier shopping centre, two blocks of serviced apartments, an office block and a 5-star hotel. The mall had also went through an extension in 2016 called Pavilion Elite, followed by a new residential block which was developed on top of it.

On 3 December 2021, it had opened its sister mall in the southern suburbs of Kuala Lumpur by the name of Pavilion Bukit Jalil, featuring 1.8 million sq ft of shopping and Malaysia's first Tsutaya Bookstore along with Malaysia's longest Muji Store. The mall also features a projection mapping dome at its centrer court. A third mall under the same name, although significantly smaller at only 1 million sq ft, known as Pavilion Damansara Heights was opened to the public on 9 October 2023.

== Shopping precincts ==
Pavilion Kuala Lumpur consists of eight shopping precincts and a row of street-front boutiques.

=== Beauty Hall ===
Spanning 20,400 sq ft (1,900 m^{2}), Beauty Hall is an oasis of rest and relaxation for shoppers with a myriad of spas and salons.

=== Centre Court ===
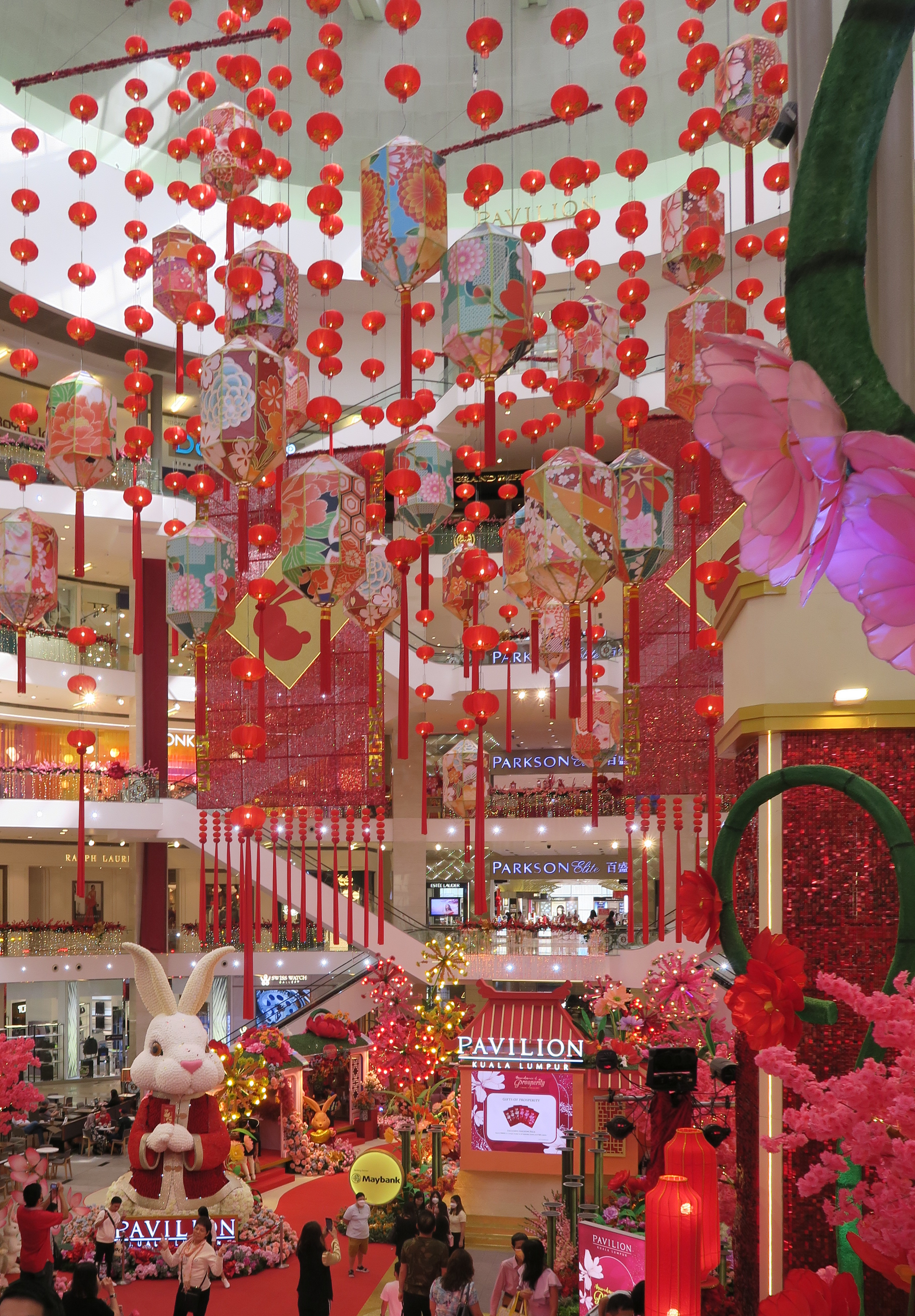
Chinese New Year display at the Centre Court of Pavilion in 2023

Apart from housing Dôme and Cafe Kitsune, Centre Court is the place where all the large-scale events and promotions happen. Festive celebrations and thematic events such as KL Fashion Week and Waku Waku Japan Festival are all held in this area. The event area once featured the tallest Swarovski Christmas tree in Asia as part of the centre's Christmas celebration.

=== Couture Pavilion ===
Located on Levels 2 and 3, Couture Pavilion is dedicated to some of the most renowned fashion labels in the world.

=== Dining Loft ===
Located at Level 7, Dining Loft is home to some first-in Malaysia and casual dining restaurants.

=== Fashion Avenue ===
Located on Levels 2 and 3, Fashion Avenue brings together various fashion stores.

=== Gourmet Emporium ===
Spanning the entire Level 1, Gourmet Emporium is a food haven that offers a full range of dining choices. Gourmet supermarket The Food Merchant anchors the precinct while Singaporean food court chain Food Republic anchors the food atrium. Located nearby the Gourmet Emporium is an underpass to the adjacent Fahrenheit 88.

=== Tokyo Street ===
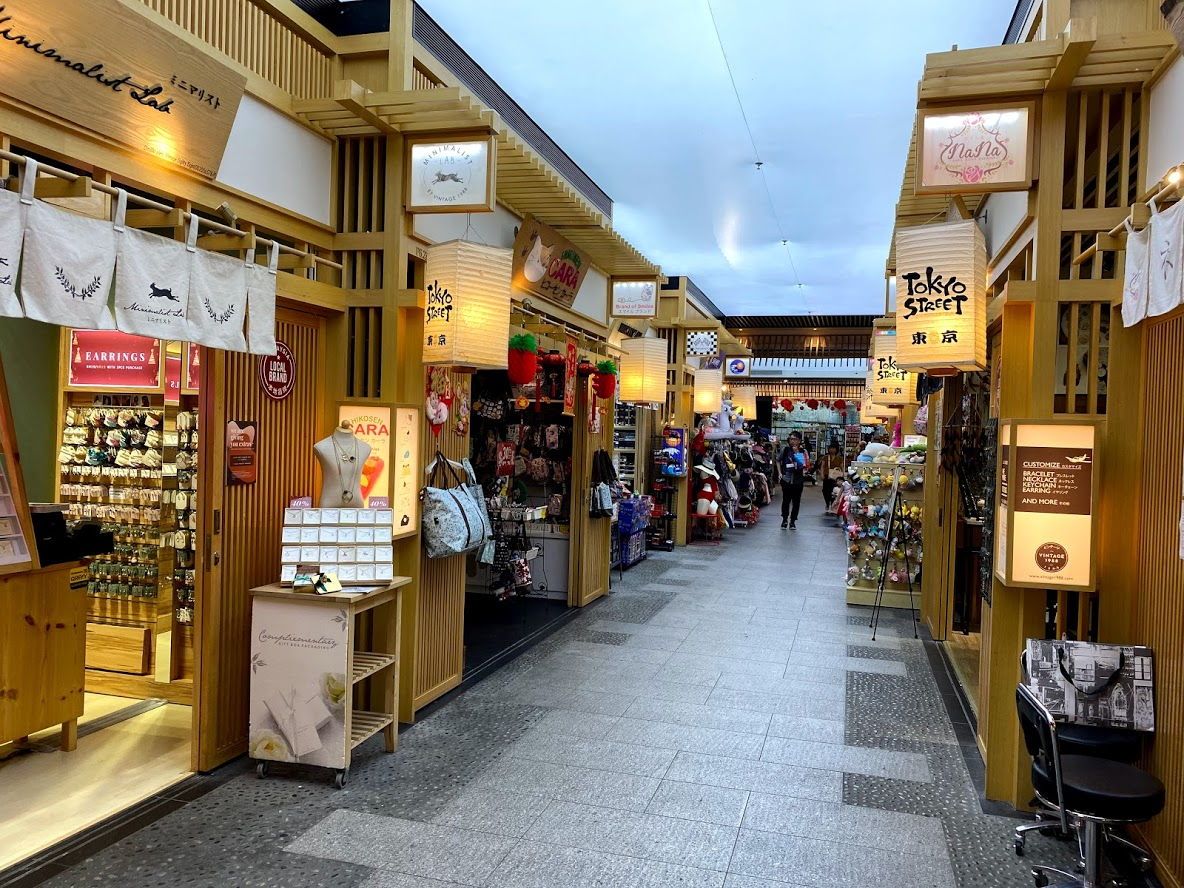
The Tokyo Street section of the mall

Located on the east end of Level 6, Tokyo Street is a Japanese-themed precinct merging traditional and modern elements of Japan under one roof. It houses Daiso, established Japanese restaurants and snack brands, Japanese art stores, and Japan-themed souvenir shops.

== Mall extension ==
Pavilion Elite is the retail expansion of Pavilion KL and is built adjacent to the complex. It opened its doors to the public on the 29th of November 2016. Pavilion Elite has a net lettable area of 250,000 square feet (23,000 m^{2}) (land area around 1.29 acres (0.52 ha)) spanning ten floors. The retail podium houses the largest Coach store in South-East Asia and the first COS in Malaysia.

In the future, the mall will also have a new retail extension as part of the Pavilion Square complex that is currently being built right across Jalan Raja Chulan.

== Transport ==
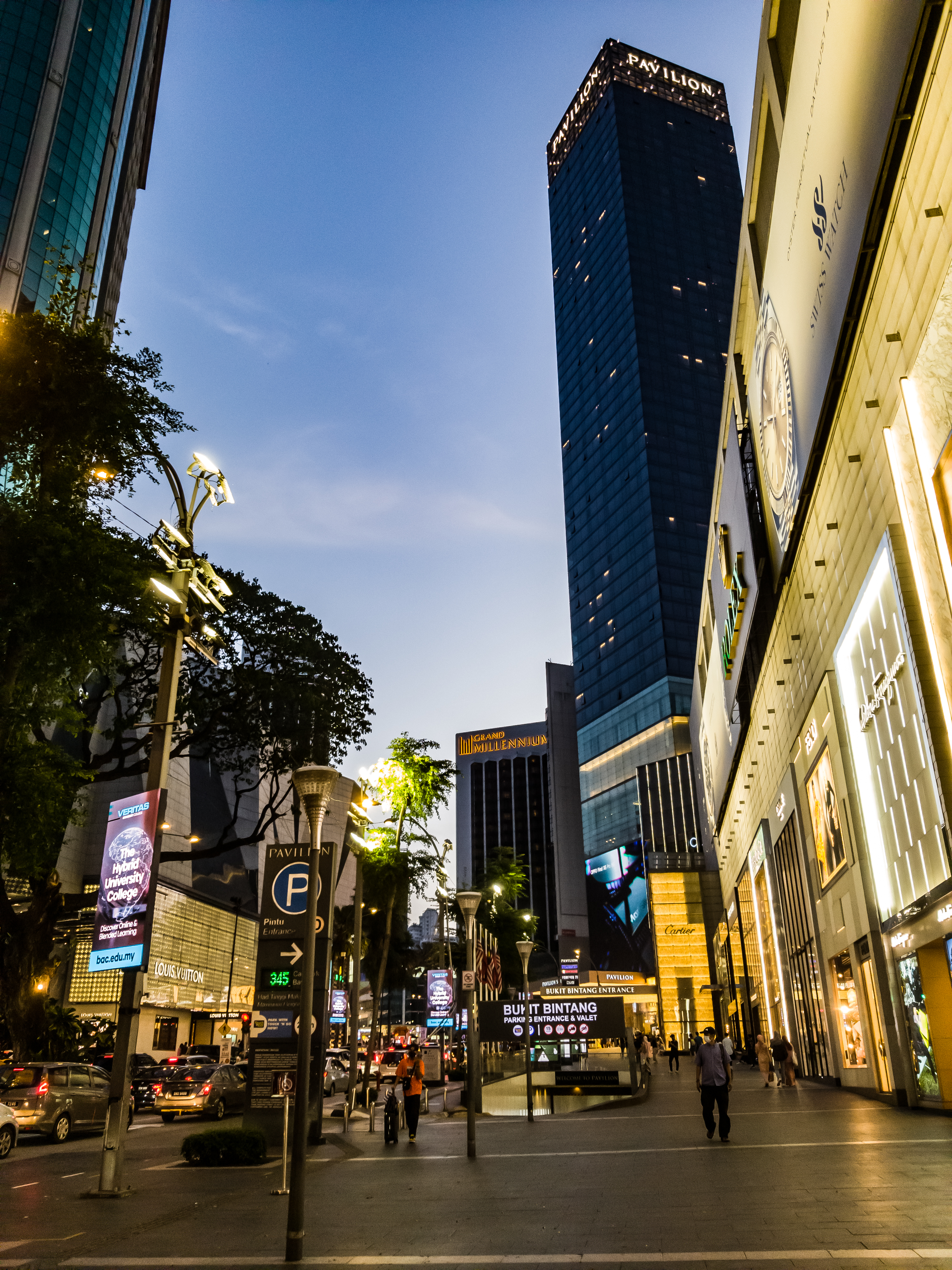
Pavilion Kuala Lumpur, frontage facing Jalan Bukit Bintang.

Pavilion Kuala Lumpur is located a short walk away from either of Bukit Bintang MRT/Monorail station from the south or Raja Chulan Monorail station from the north. The centre is also linked to Kuala Lumpur Convention Centre and Suria KLCC (and hence its LRT station) via an elevated pedestrian walkway. The pedestrian walkaway is air-conditioned and is about 1 kilometre long, about 15 to 20 minutes to walk.

== See also ==
- Pavilion Bukit Jalil
- Pavilion Damansara Heights
- List of shopping malls in Malaysia
