= Berjaya Times Square Theme Park =

Amusement park in Kuala Lumpur, Malaysia

Coordinates: 3°08′32″N 101°42′38″E

- Previously known as Cosmo's World

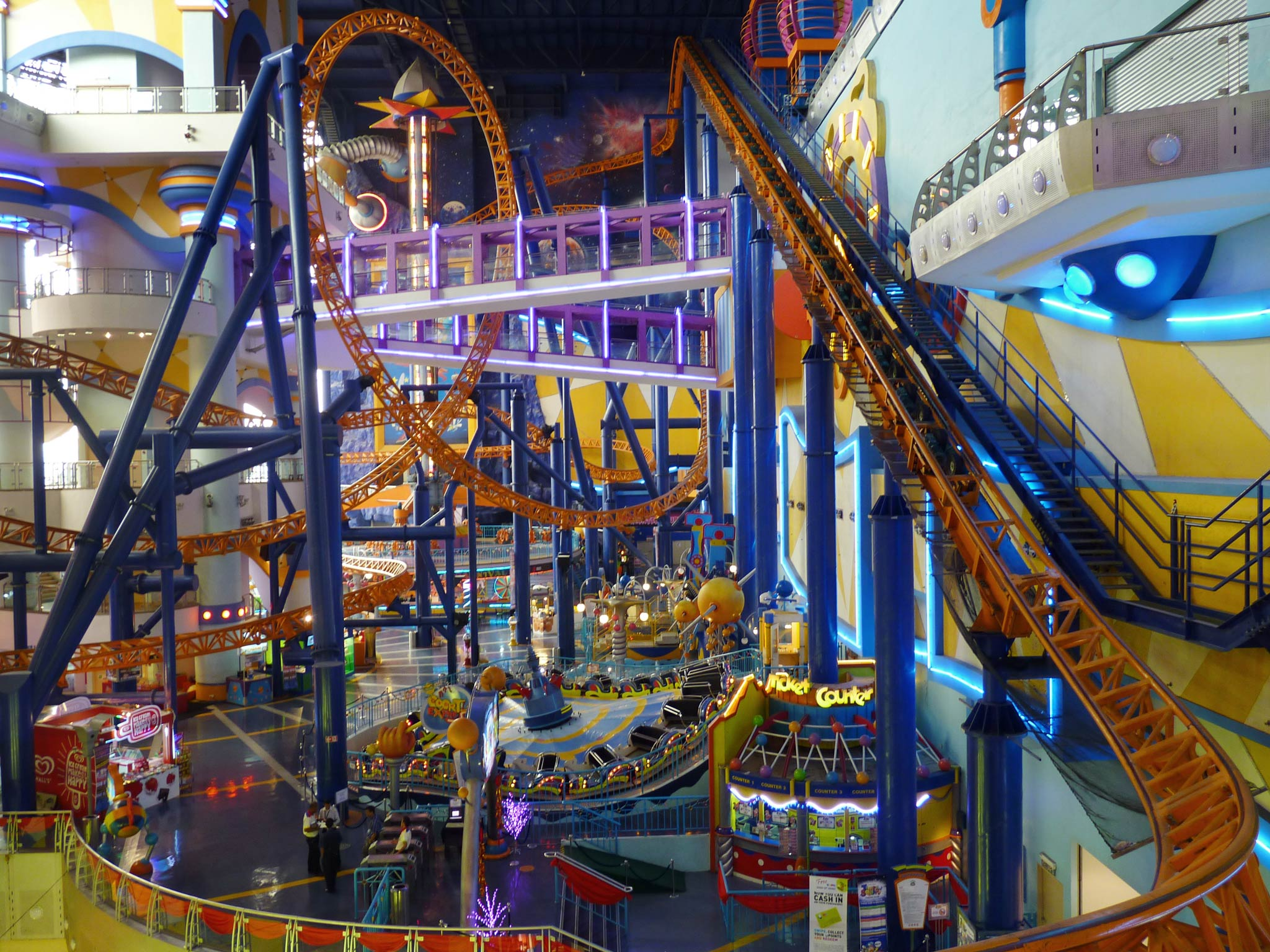
- Interactive map of Berjaya Times Square Theme Park
- Location: Kuala Lumpur, Malaysia
- Opened: 2003
- Area: 133,000 feet (41,000 m)

Attractions
- Total: 14
- Roller coasters: 1
- Website: https://www.berjayatimessquarethemeparkkl.com/

Berjaya Times Square Theme Park (formerly Cosmo's World) is an indoor amusement park on the 5th to 8th floors of Berjaya Times Square, Kuala Lumpur, Malaysia. It was conceived as the "largest indoor, all weather, all ages, entertainment destination in the region" and is the second largest indoor amusement park in Malaysia.

== Rides ==
With 12 rides, Berjaya Times Square Theme Park is divided into two differently themed areas, Galaxy Station and Fantasy Garden.
