= Sungei Wang Plaza =

Shopping mall in Bukit Bintang, Kuala Lumpur, Malaysia

- Plaza Sungei Wang
- Location: Bukit Bintang, Kuala Lumpur, Malaysia
- Coordinates: 3°08′40.8″N 101°42′39.6″E
- Opened: January 1977
- Developer: Sungei Wang Plaza Sdn Bhd
- Num. of stores: 674
- Num. of anchor tenants: 2 (Giant Hypermarket, JUMPA@Sungei Wang)
- Floor area: 823,945 square feet (76,547.0 m^{2})
- Floors: 8 (shopping), 3 (parking)
- Public transit: KG18A Pavilion Kuala Lumpur–Bukit Bintang MRT station MR6 Bukit Bintang Monorail station
- Website: sungeiwang.com

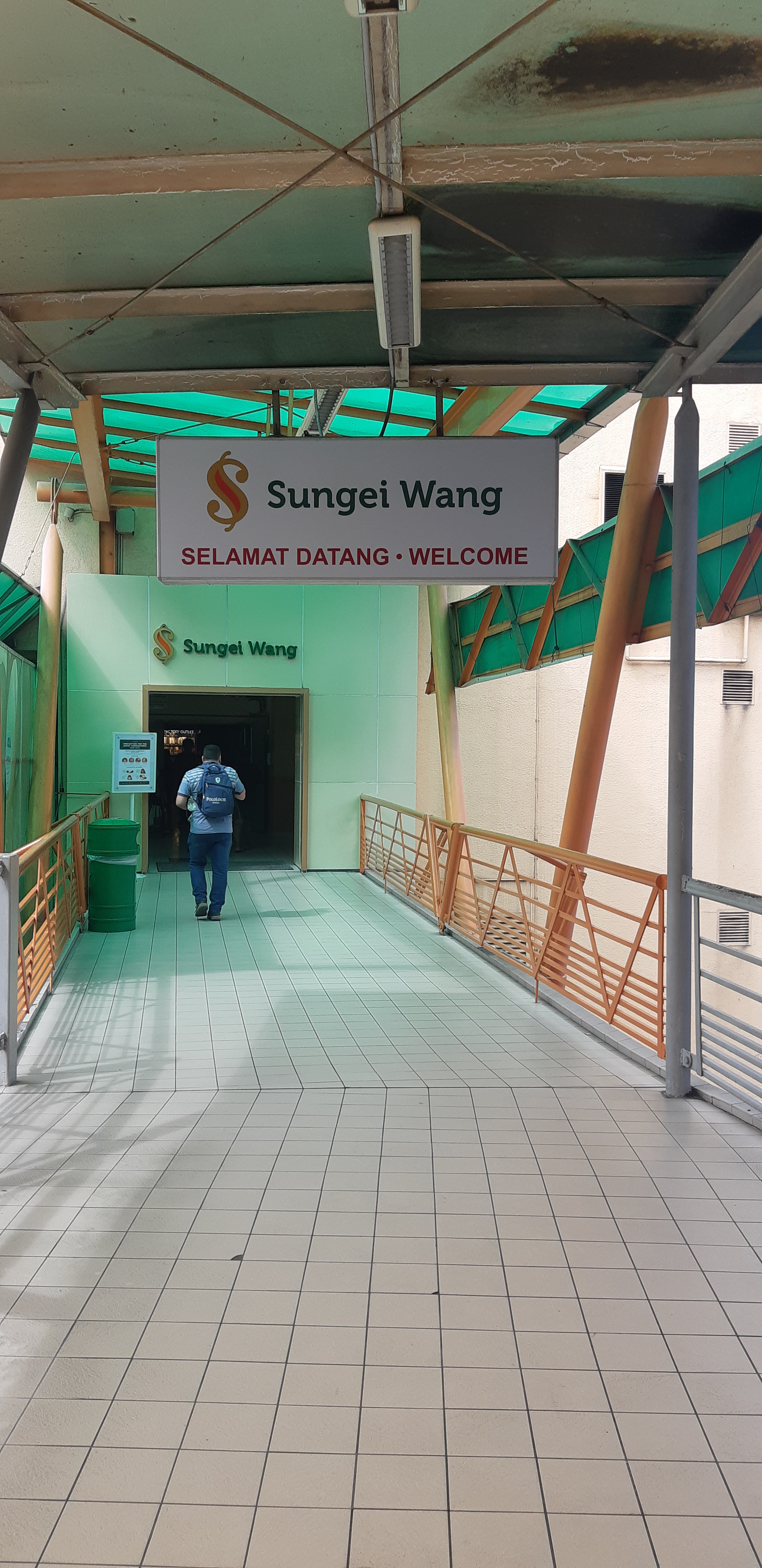
Access to Sungei Wang Plaza from Bukit Bintang Monorail.

Sungei Wang Plaza (Malay: Plaza Sungei Wang) is a strata title shopping centre in Bukit Bintang, Kuala Lumpur, Malaysia.

The mall has an aggregate retail floor area of approximately 800,000 square feet (sq. ft.) and key anchor tenant includes Cold Storage (Formerly Giant Supermarket), JUMPA @ Sungei Wang, Blastacars, Camp5, Daiso and MR. DIY. The shopping center is accessible from Bukit Bintang MRT/Monorail.

== History ==
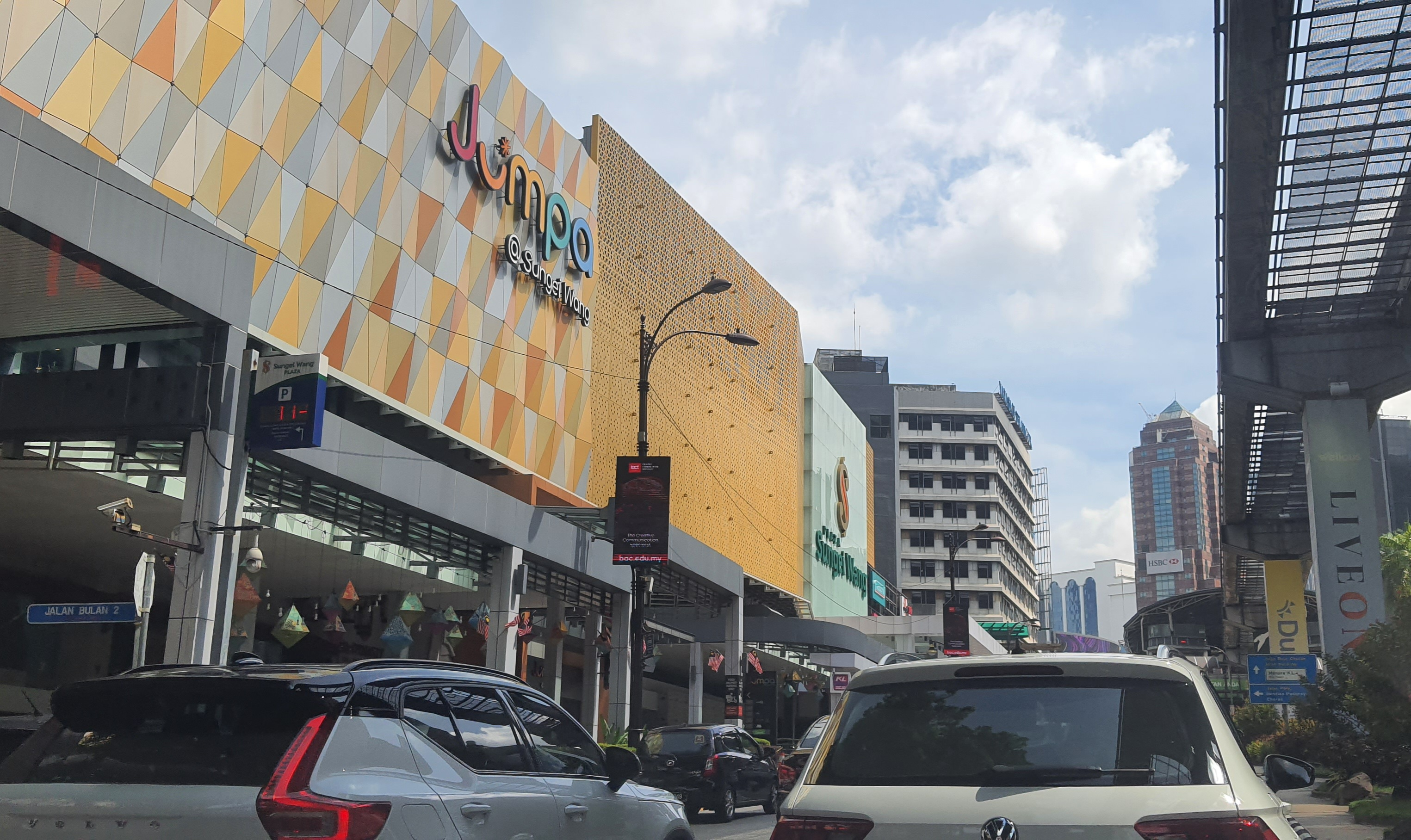
The renovated Sungei Wang Plaza, Kuala Lumpur, taken in July 2022.

Formerly the site of Bukit Bintang Park, the shopping centre was incorporated on 16 May 1972 and was opened for business in 1977, built at a cost of RM 100 million.

In 1992 and 2013, it underwent renovation and refurbishment. In 2018, it undergoes another facade transformation and was completed in 2019.

The largest share of shopping mall owner is by Capitaland Malaysia Mall Trust (CMMT) which owns 62% of the share.

== See also ==
- List of shopping malls in Malaysia
