= Bukit Bintang Monorail station =

Monorail station in Kuala Lumpur, Malaysia

MR6 Bukit Bintang
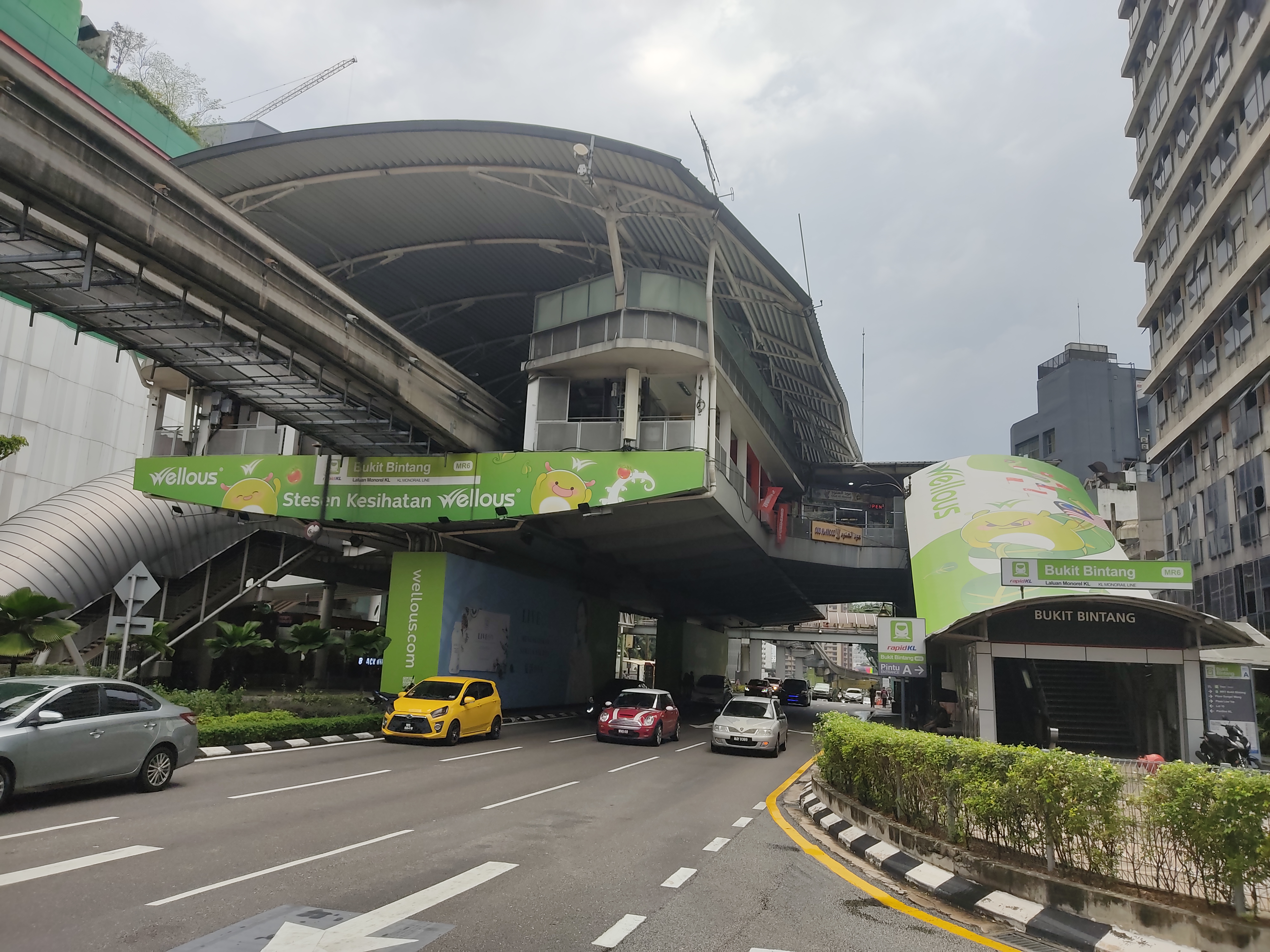
- The exterior of the Bukit Bintang Monorail station as of October 2021

General information
- Other names: Malay: بوکيت بينتڠ (Jawi); Chinese: 武吉免登; Tamil: புக்கிட் பிந்தாங்
- Location: Jalan Sultan Ismail-Jalan Bukit Bintang intersection, Bukit Bintang; 55100 Kuala Lumpur; Malaysia
- Coordinates: 3°8′45″N 101°42′40″E
- System: Rapid KL
- Owner: Prasarana Malaysia
- Operator: Rapid Rail
- Line: 8 KL Monorail
- Platforms: 2 side platform
- Tracks: 2
- Connections: Connecting station to KG18A Bukit Bintang

Construction
- Structure type: MR6 Elevated
- Parking: Not available
- Cycle facilities: Not available
- Accessible: Available

Other information
- Station code: MR6

History
- Opened: 31 August 2003; 22 years ago
- Former names: AirAsia–Bukit Bintang (2015–2019)

Services
| Preceding station | | Following station |
|---|---|---|
| Imbi towards Kuala Lumpur Sentral | KL Monorail | Raja Chulan towards Titiwangsa |
Location

Bukit Bintang Monorail station is an elevated monorail station located in Bukit Bintang, Kuala Lumpur. As part of the KL Monorail line, it opened alongside the rest of the train service on 31 August 2003.

This monorail station is not interchangeable (or integrated) and not to be confused with the separate but adjacent Bukit Bintang MRT station, which is served by the MRT Kajang Line instead.

== History ==
The monorail station was opened on Hari Merdeka, 31 August 2003, along with the rest of the KL Monorail line.

The station was officially expanded on 13 September 2015 under the KL Monorail expansion program to accommodate new 4-car monorail trains by Scomi (Scomi SUTRA), and opened up 3 new entrances that directly leads to neighbouring malls.

=== Station Naming Rights Programme ===
The station was previously known as AirAsia-Bukit Bintang on 9 October 2015 after Malaysian low-cost airline AirAsia was given naming rights by Prasarana Malaysia, under the station naming rights programme. Nonetheless, the contract was terminated in 2019 and all signs bearing the AirAsia prefix were removed from the station.

== Location ==
The station is situated in Bukit Bintang (translated from Malay to English as "Starhill"), a shopping hub in the Kuala Lumpur Golden Triangle commercial district. The monorail station is erected over Jalan Sultan Ismail, where it is located directly south from the intersection of Jalan Sultan Ismail and Jalan Bukit Bintang.

Due to its proximity to Bukit Bintang, the monorail station receives a high volume of passengers during peak hours and non-working days.

=== Interchange ===
Bukit Bintang MRT station of the MRT Kajang Line and Bukit Bintang Monorail station are in the strict sense, two distinct stations, although both originally had the same names (now distinct with the new branding). Paid zone-to-paid zone integration between the two was proposed but not observable at the moment. The previous AirAsia branding used on the Monorail station was not extended to the underground MRT station, which has a different branding under the Station Naming Rights programme (Pavilion Kuala Lumpur-Bukit Bintang MRT station). Passengers will have to walk along the Yayasan Selangor building or Lot 10 shopping mall to get to the MRT station from the monorail station, and vice versa.

=== Position within the Klang Valley Integrated Transit System ===
The Bukit Bintang station is the first monorail station (alongside three other stations) towards the Titiwangsa to be lined along Jalan Sultan Ismail. The line towards the KL Sentral thereafter turns west towards Jalan Imbi at the Jalan Sultan Ismail-Jalan Imbi intersection.

The station is one of four KL Monorail stations that serves the Kuala Lumpur Golden Triangle locality, the other three being the Raja Chulan (500 metres away), Imbi (also 500 metres away), and Hang Tuah.

== Layout ==
=== Station layout plan ===
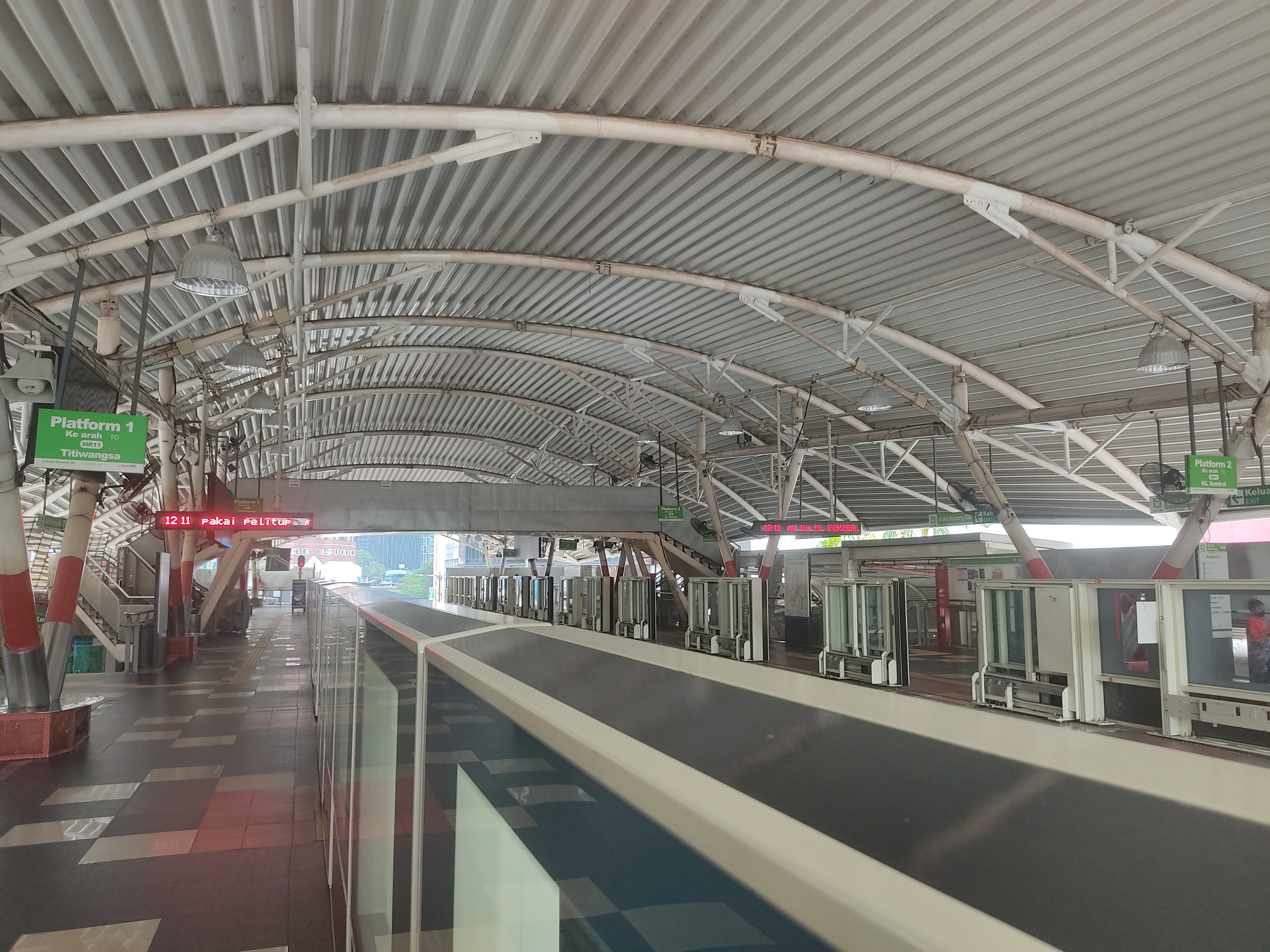
Platform level of the station, connecting bridge is visible from the image

| L2 | Station Platform Level & Staircase Linkway | Side platform |
| L2 | Station Platform Level & Staircase Linkway | Platform 1 8 KL Monorail towards MR11 Titiwangsa (→) |
| L2 | Station Platform Level & Staircase Linkway | Platform 2 8 KL Monorail towards MR1 KL Sentral (←) |
| L2 | Station Platform Level & Staircase Linkway | Side platform |
| L1 | Station Concourse | Faregates, Ticketing Machines, Monorail Station Control, Concourse Staircase Linkway, Unpaid Area Escalator to/from Street Level |
| L1 | Linkway | Pedestrian Linkway to Shopping Mall |
| G | Street Level | Jalan Sultan Ismail, Shops, Taxi Lay-by, Pedestrian Crossing, Bukit Bintang MRT entrance |

The station has five signed exits. Similar to the nearby Imbi, the Bukit Bintang Monorail station is also directly within walking distance from various other shopping centres (including Starhill Gallery, Low Yat Plaza, Pavilion Kuala Lumpur, Fahrenheit 88, Lot 10, Imbi Plaza and Sungei Wang Plaza). The station is also the only KL Monorail station to include an overhead link bridge that directly connects its two train platforms, instead of a walkway underneath the monorail platforms and tracks. The station's length is also longer in comparison with the other KL Monorail stations.

=== Exits and Entrances ===
KL Monorail station
| Entrance | Destination | Picture |
| A | Street level access. West side of Jalan Sultan Ismail; Low Yat Plaza, Ain Arabia, Bukit Bintang Street, Bukit Bintang MRT station (Entrance C); Escalators up only | |
| B | Access to Sungei Wang - Lot 10 pedestrian linkway Sungei Wang Plaza, Lot 10 | |
| C | Street level access. East side of Jalan Sultan Ismail; Starhill Gallery, Bintang Walk, Pavilion Kuala Lumpur, Bukit Bintang MRT station (Entrance D); Escalators up only | |
| D | Direct access to Lot 10 | |
| E | Access to Sungei Wang - Lot 10 pedestrian linkway Sungei Wang Plaza | |

== Around the station ==
- Fahrenheit 88
- Lot 10
- Starhill Gallery
- Sungei Wang Plaza
- Pavilion Kuala Lumpur
- Bukit Bintang MRT station

== See also ==
- List of rail transit stations in the Klang Valley area
- Bukit Bintang
- Bukit Bintang MRT station
