= Raja Chulan station =

Monorail station in Kuala Lumpur, Malaysia

MR7 Raja Chulan
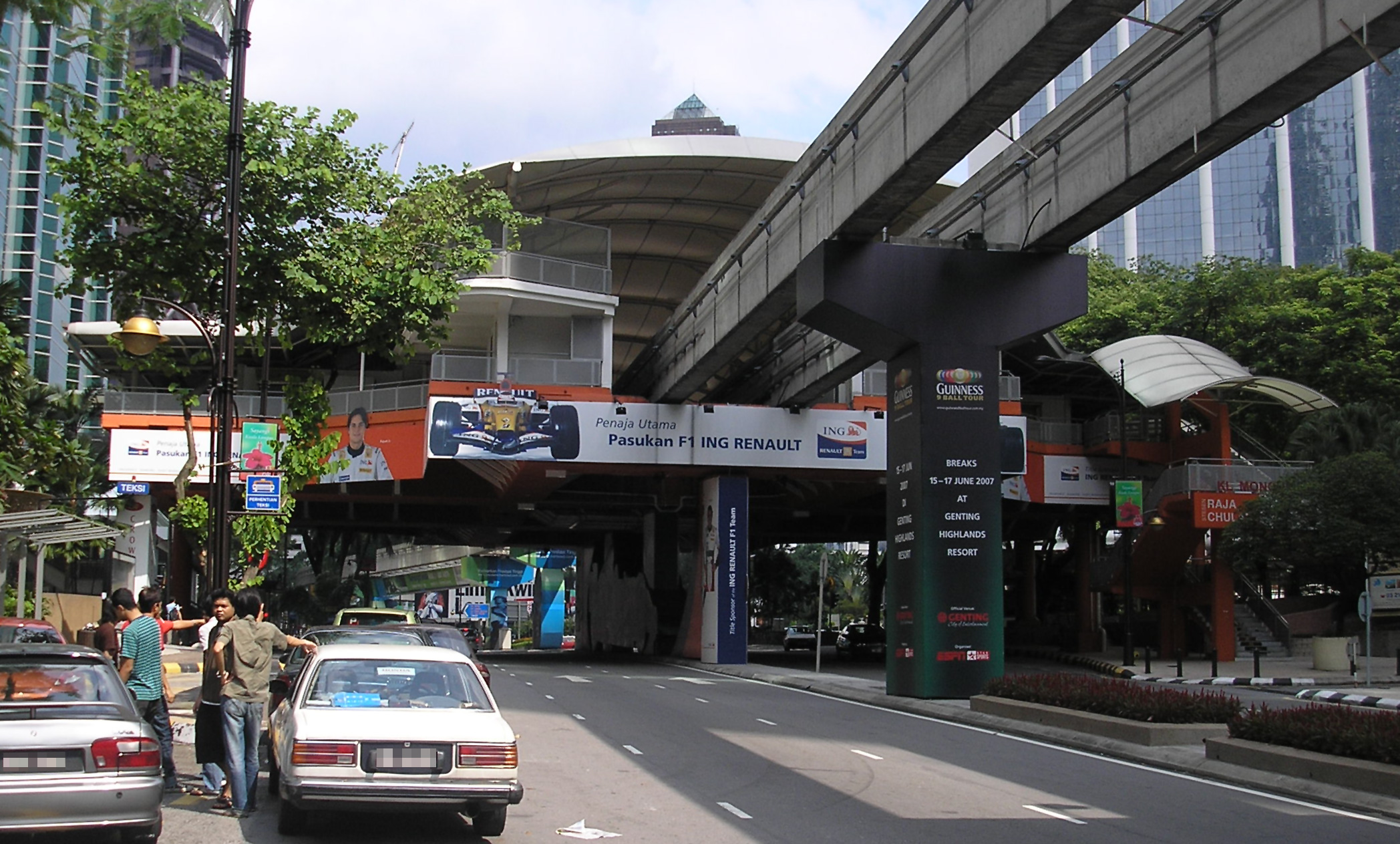
- The exterior of the Raja Chulan station, as seen towards the southeast.

General information
- Other names: Malay: راج چولن (Jawi); Chinese: 拉惹朱兰; Tamil: ராஜா சூலான்
- Location: Jalan Sultan Ismail; 50450 Kuala Lumpur; Malaysia
- Coordinates: 3°9′2″N 101°42′37″E
- System: Rapid KL
- Owner: Prasarana Malaysia
- Operator: Rapid Rail
- Line: 8 KL Monorail
- Platforms: 2 side platforms
- Tracks: 2

Construction
- Structure type: Elevated
- Parking: Not available
- Cycle facilities: Not available
- Accessible: Available

Other information
- Station code: MR7

History
- Opened: 31 August 2003; 23 years ago

Services
Preceding station		Following station
Bukit Bintang Monorail towards Kuala Lumpur Sentral	KL Monorail	Bukit Nanas towards Titiwangsa
Location

Raja Chulan station is a Malaysian elevated monorail train station that is part of the Kuala Lumpur Monorail (KL Monorail) line, located in Kuala Lumpur and opened alongside the rest of the monorail service on 31 August 2003.

The station is located closer to the northern side of the Kuala Lumpur Golden Triangle, a designated commercial hub in the city. The station is also situated over Jalan Sultan Ismail, stopping between several commercial skyscrapers directly north from the Jalan Sultan Ismail-Changkat Raja Chulan intersection. The station has two exits to both sides of Jalan Sultan Ismail, and is named after the nearby Jalan Raja Chulan.

The station is one of four Kuala Lumpur Monorail stations that serve the Kuala Lumpur Golden Triangle locality, the other three being the Bukit Bintang (500 metres away), the Imbi, and the Hang Tuah. The Bukit Nanas Monorail station is situated 1 kilometre north.

== Layout ==
=== Station layout plan ===
L2	Station Platform Level & Staircase Linkway	Side platform
L2	Station Platform Level & Staircase Linkway	Platform 1 8 KL Monorail towards MR11 Titiwangsa (→)
L2	Station Platform Level & Staircase Linkway	Platform 2 8 KL Monorail towards MR1 KL Sentral (←)
L2	Station Platform Level & Staircase Linkway	Side platform
L1	Station Concourse	Faregates, Ticketing Machines, Monorail Station Control, Concourse Staircase Linkway, Unpaid Area Escalator to/from Street Level
L1	Linkway	Pedestrian Linkway
G	Street Level	Jalan Sultan Ismail, Jalan Raja Chulan, Taxi Lay-by

== Nearby Landmarks ==
- Impiana KLCC Hotel
- Menara KH
- Tradewinds Square Tower

== See also ==
- List of rail transit stations in the Klang Valley area
