= Bukit Bintang MRT station =

MRT station in Kuala Lumpur, Malaysia

KG18A – Bukit Bintang

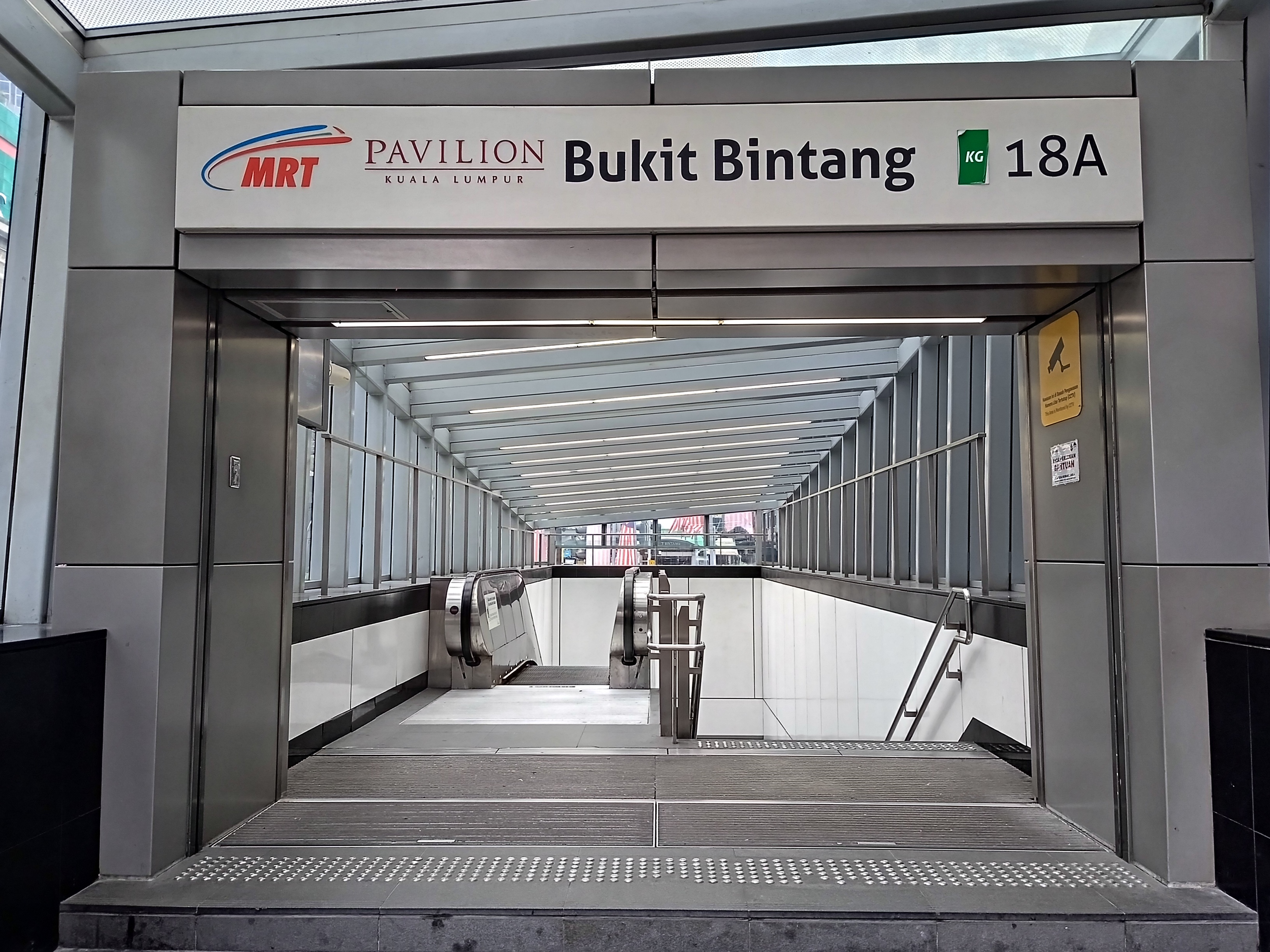
- Entrance F of the station

General information
- Other names: Malay: بوکيت بينتڠ (Jawi); Chinese: 武吉免登; Tamil: புக்கிட் பிந்தாங்
- Location: Jalan Bukit Bintang, Bukit Bintang; 55100 Kuala Lumpur; Malaysia
- Coordinates: 3°8′47.41″N 101°42′39.41″E
- System: Rapid KL
- Owner: MRT Corp
- Operator: Rapid Rail
- Line: 9 Kajang Line
- Platforms: 2 split platforms
- Tracks: 2
- Connections: Connecting station to MR6 Bukit Bintang for KL Monorail

Construction
- Structure type: Underground
- Depth: 33.4 metres (110 ft)
- Platform levels: 2
- Parking: Not available
- Cycle facilities: Not available
- Accessible: Yes

Other information
- Status: Operational
- Station code: KG18A

History
- Opened: 17 July 2017; 9 years ago
- Former names: Bukit Bintang Sentral

Services
Preceding station		Following station
Merdeka towards Kwasa Damansara	Kajang Line	Tun Razak Exchange towards Kajang
Location
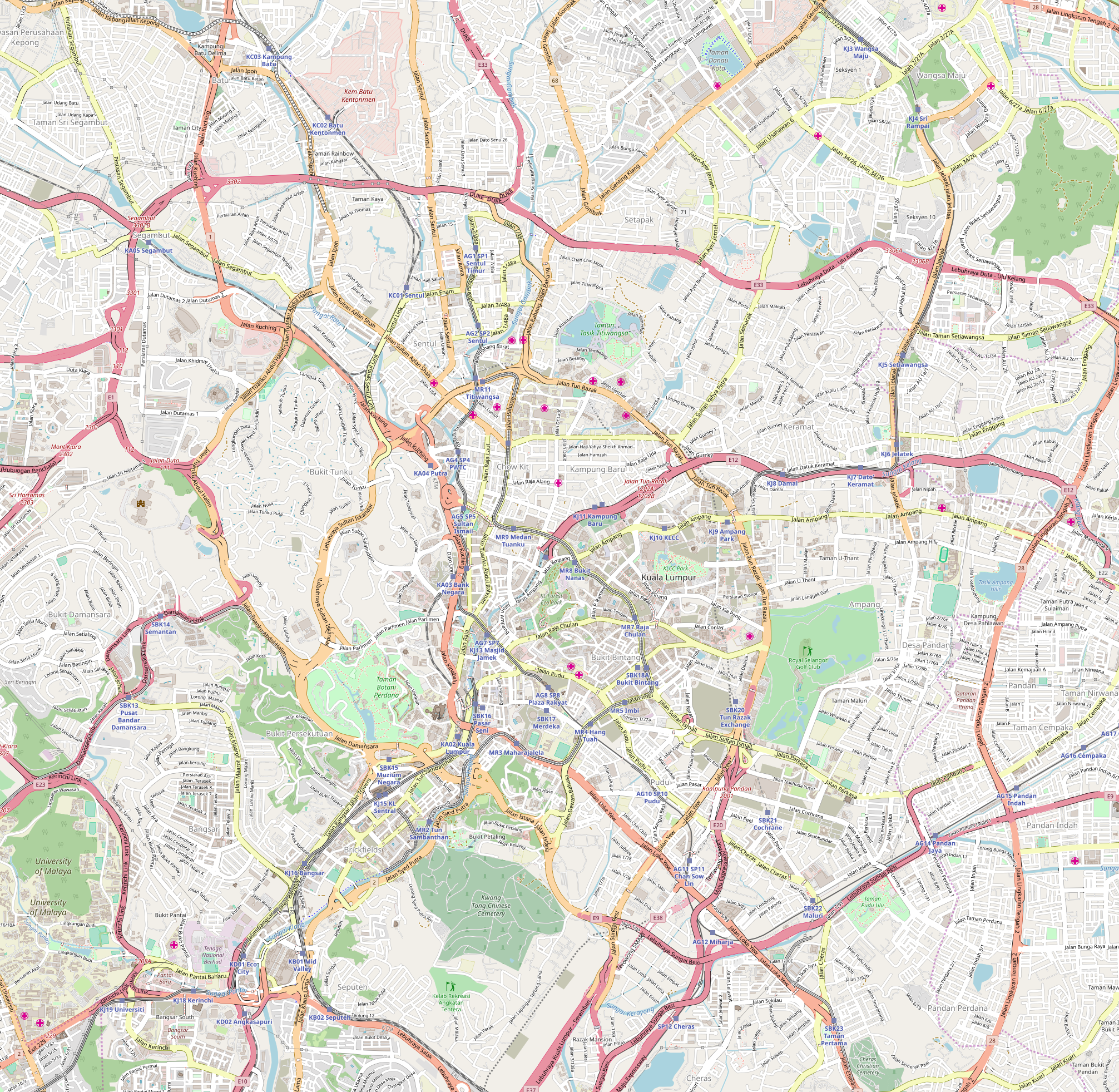
- Location within central Kuala Lumpur

The Bukit Bintang MRT station, also known as Pavilion Kuala Lumpur–Bukit Bintang MRT station under the station naming rights programme, is a mass rapid transit (MRT) underground station in Kuala Lumpur, Malaysia. Construction started around 2012, and the station opened on 17 July 2017. It is served by MRT Kajang Line (formerly known as MRT Sungai Buloh–Kajang Line). The station has 5 walkways and entrances that are connected to iconic buildings and malls in the Bukit Bintang locality, including the Pavilion Kuala Lumpur, The Starhill and Fahrenheit 88 shopping malls. The main theme of the MRT station is Dynamic Pulse of Colour.

This MRT station, despite its name, is not integrated and not to be confused with the separate Bukit Bintang Monorail station, which is served by the KL Monorail line instead. Paid zone-to-paid zone integration was once proposed but has not been constructed.

== History and background ==
According to earlier plans, there were meant to be two stations in Bukit Bintang, namely Bukit Bintang West and Bukit Bintang East (or Bukit Bintang 1 and Bukit Bintang 2), but it was later reduced to only one Bukit Bintang station after public display and feedback. This was reflected in the station's rather odd numbering: KG18A.

The construction of the MRT station started around 2012 and ended around mid-2017. It was opened on 17 July 2017 as part of Phase 2 of the then MRT Sungai Buloh-Kajang Line.

=== Station naming rights ===
The station naming rights were acquired by the owner of the Pavilion Kuala Lumpur shopping centre, a high-end and high-street shopping mall, located east of the station in Bukit Bintang.

== Location ==
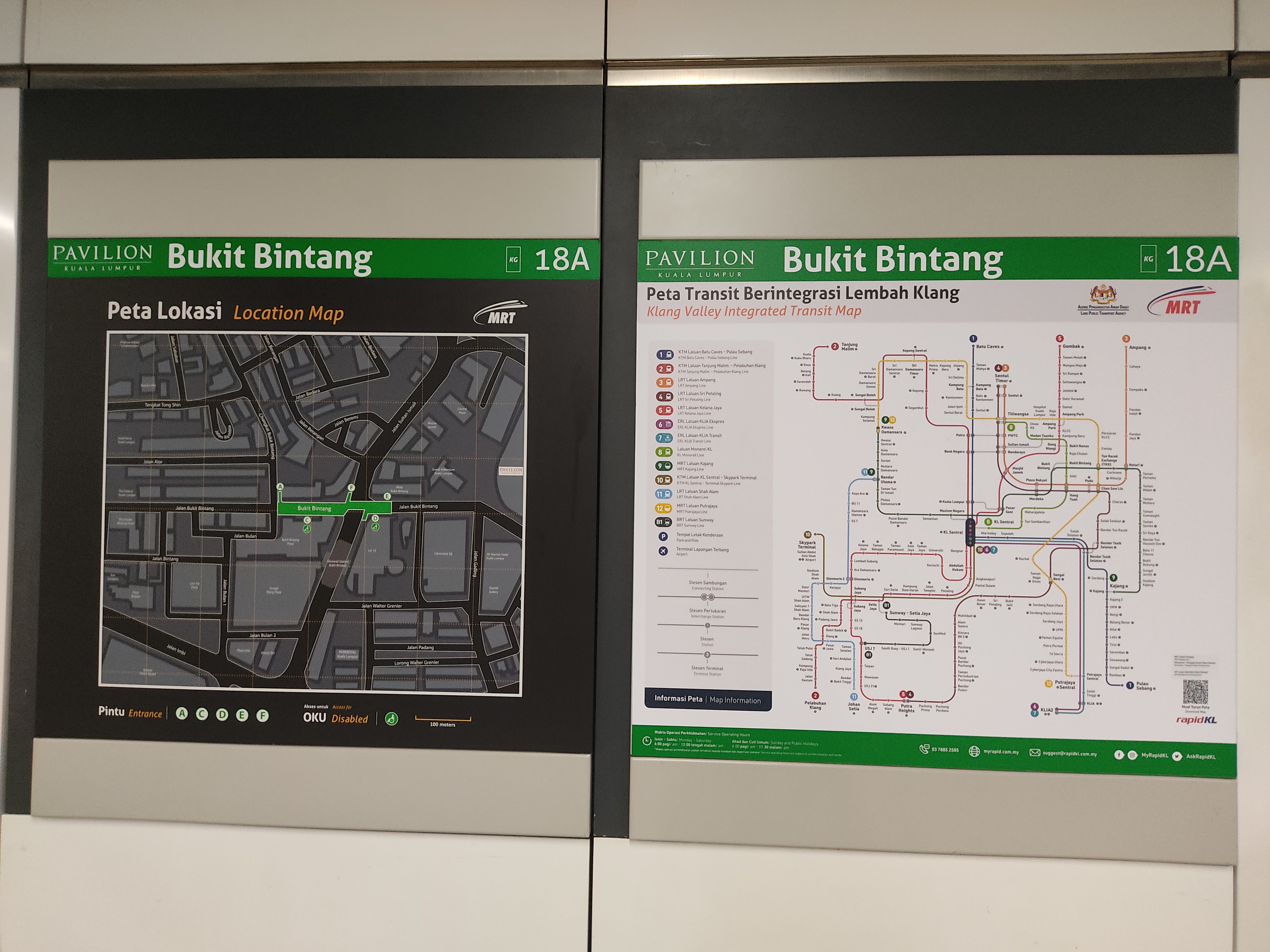
Map of Bukit Bintang MRT station

The MRT station is situated in the heart of Bukit Bintang, a shopping hub in the Kuala Lumpur Golden Triangle commercial district. Located underneath Jalan Bukit Bintang, the station's entrances are located along the iconic intersection of Jalan Bukit Bintang and Jalan Sultan Ismail.

=== Interchange ===
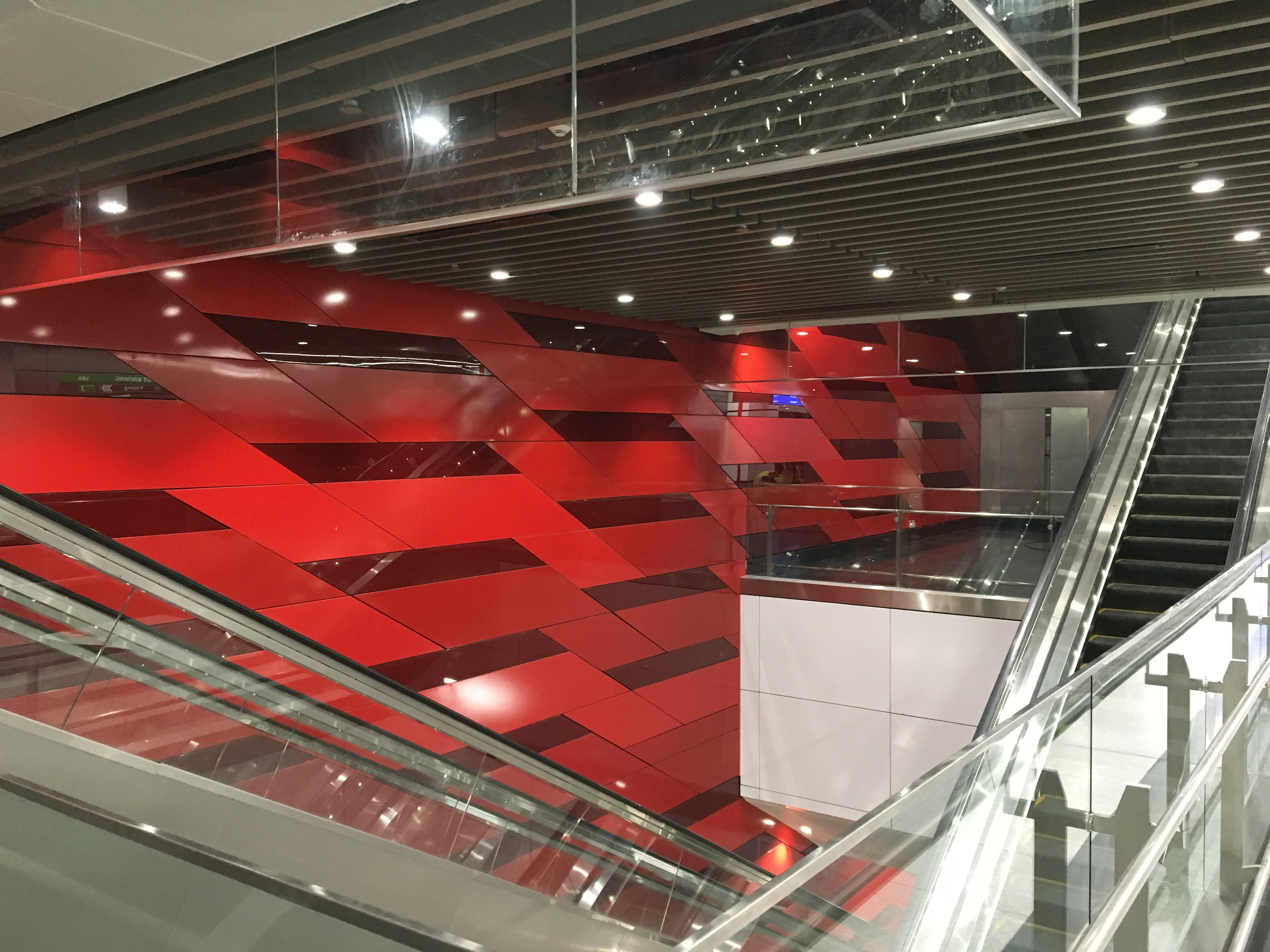
The view from Platform 1 (Kajang-bound) of the escalators from the concourse level to Platform 2 (Kwasa Damansara-bound) below.

The station is designated as a connecting station with, and is within walking distance of the KL Monorail station of the same name, nearby Entrance C and D of the MRT station. Despite being in close proximity, there is no paid area transfer due to space constraints. Those transferring from the MRT station to the monorail station and vice versa will have to tap out, walk along the Yayasan Selangor building to/from Entrance C, or Lot 10 shopping mall to/from Entrance D, and enter the subsequent station where commuters are required to tap in again or purchase a new ticket to make their transfer. The walkway to the monorail station is uncovered.

Plans for an integrated paid area, which will effectively make the two stations into one station exist but no construction has started as of 2024.

=== Layout ===
G	Street Level	Changkat Bukit Bintang, Jalan Bukit Bintang, Jalan Sultan Ismail
B1	Concourse	Staircase/Escalators/Lifts to and from entrances, shoplots, ticket vending machines, information counter, faregates, escalators/lifts to Platforms 1 and 2
B2	Split platform, Doors will open on the right
B2	Platform 1:	9 Kajang Line towards KG35 Kajang (→)
B4	Split platform, Doors will open on the left
B4	Platform 2:	9 Kajang Line towards KG04 Kwasa Damansara (←)

The layout for the station has its own unique features that are not found in other stations in the Klang Valley. It has up to 5 entrances around the intersection of Jalan Bukit Bintang and Jalan Sultan Ismail, allowing commuters access to several malls in the vicinity, for example Pavilion Kuala Lumpur and Lot 10. The station, being located in an area with limited space, required it to be built underground at about 28 metres deep. This was to avoid demolishing buildings along the Jalan Bukit Bintang road to make way for construction. The station contains the longest escalator among the Kajang Line stations, at 20 metres. The MRT station is also unique in the sense that it is one of only two stations on the line with split platforms, which means the platforms are stacked one on the other; one for Kwasa Damansara-bound trains and one for Kajang-bound trains.

=== Exits and entrances ===
Kajang Line station
Entrance	Destination	Picture
A	Changkat Bukit Bintang; Shoplots, Jalan Alor	
C	Jalan Bukit Bintang; Bukit Bintang monorail station Northwest entrance, Bukit Bintang Plaza (permanently closed), Low Yat Plaza, Yayasan Selangor building, pedestrian crossing	
D	Jalan Bukit Bintang; Bukit Bintang monorail station Northeast entrance, Lot 10, Fahrenheit 88, The Starhill, Pavilion Kuala Lumpur	
E	Jalan Bukit Bintang; Wolo Bukit Bintang hotel, shoplots	
F	Jalan Sultan Ismail; McDonald's, shoplots, Arab Street	

Entrance B is reserved for the future integration between the MRT station and Monorail station.

== Design ==
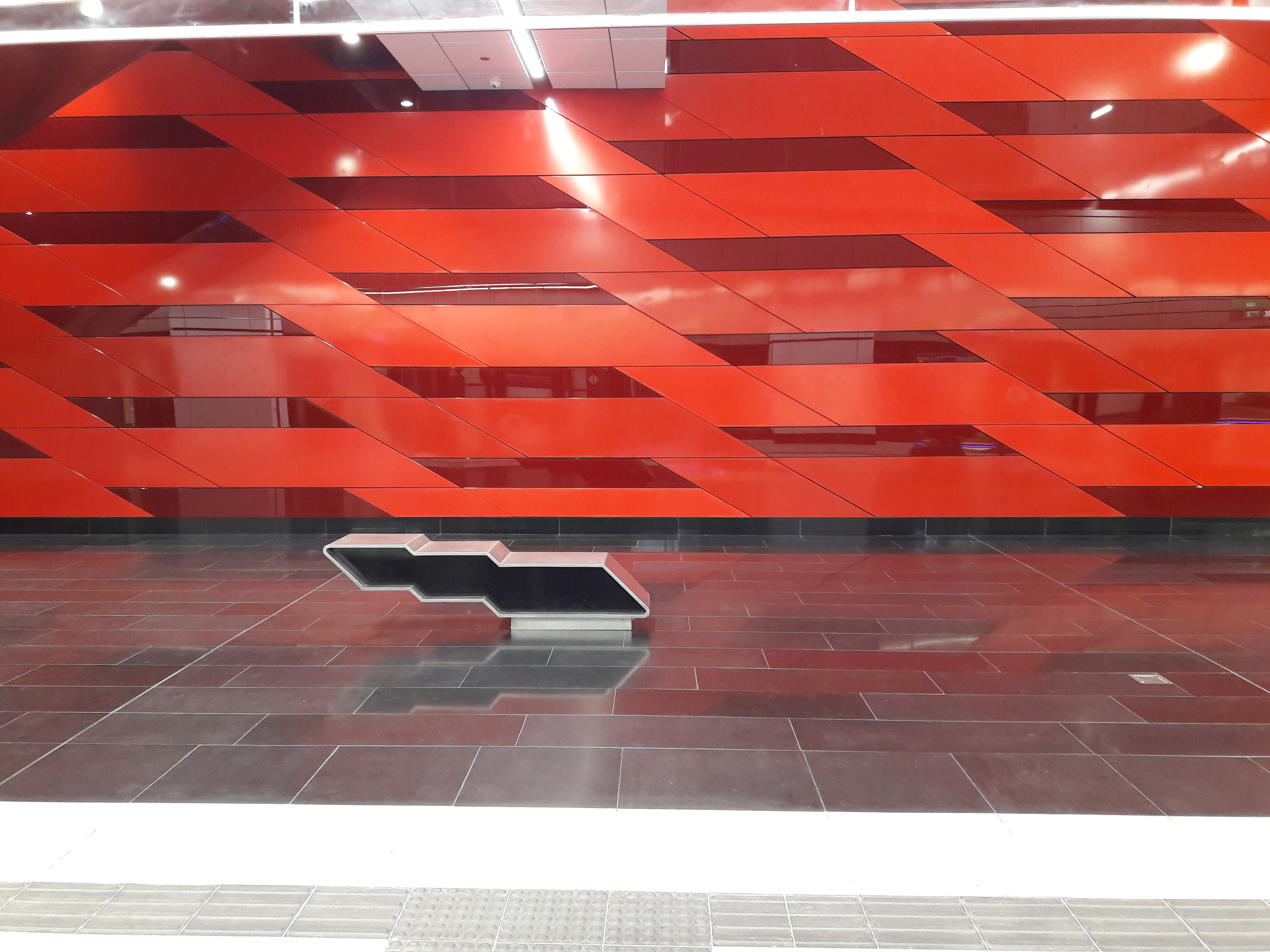
Wall of the MRT station showing the "Dynamic" theme, along with a similarly designed bench

As with all of the underground stations of the Kajang Line, Bukit Bintang station is also given an artistic interior theme, known as "Dynamic". The theme, chosen to represent the dynamic and exciting elements of the country's top central business district, is reflected with different tones of red on the walls in the interior of the station that suggest movements.

== Around the station ==
- Fahrenheit 88
- Lot 10
- The Starhill
- Sungei Wang Plaza
- Pavilion Kuala Lumpur
- Bukit Bintang Monorail station
