= Kampung Baru LRT station =

Metro station in Kuala Lumpur, Malaysia

KJ11 Kampung Baru – Co-opbank Pertama
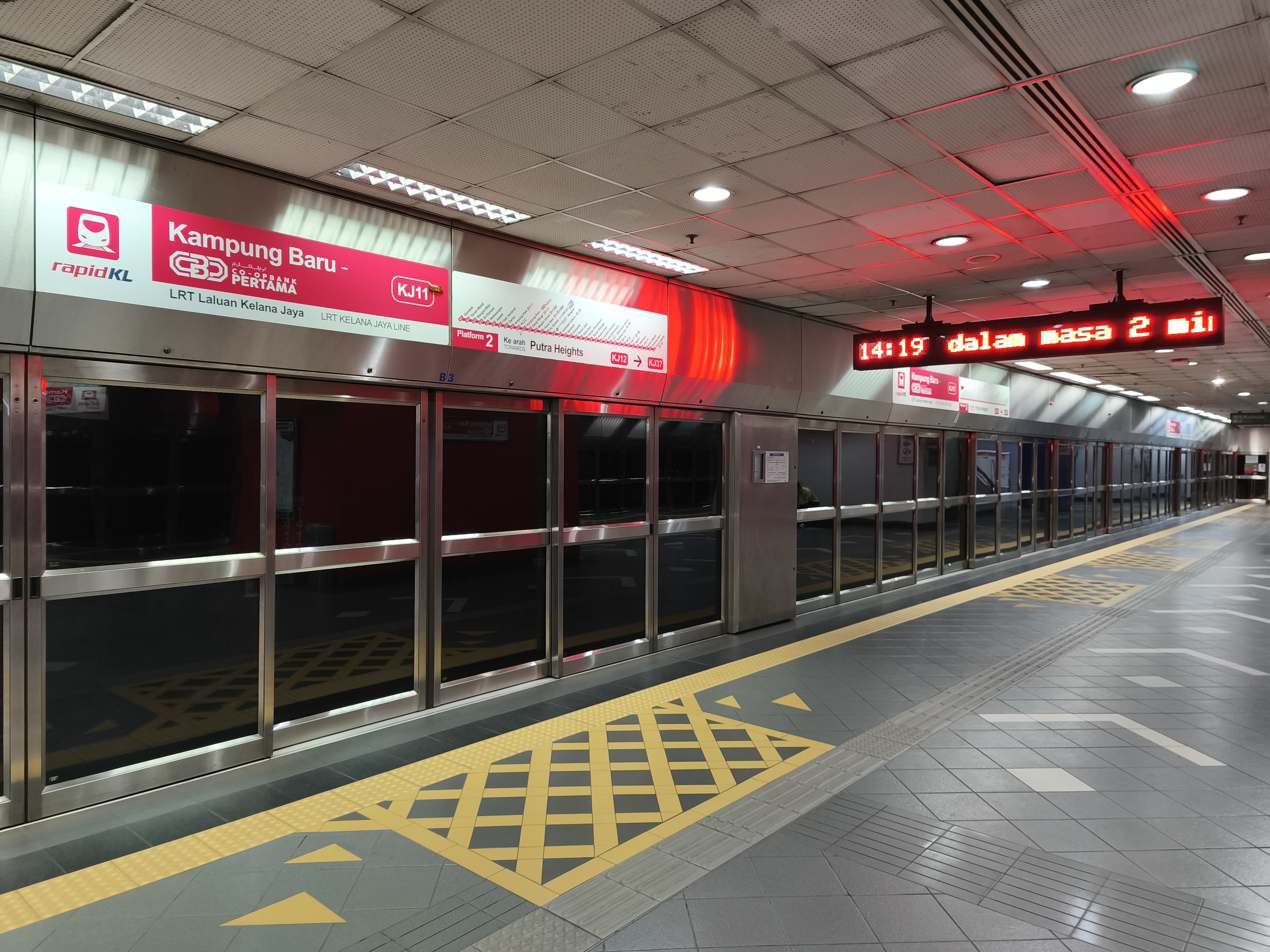
- Platform level of Kampung Baru-Co-opbank Pertama station with new brand name, 2025

General information
- Other names: Malay: کامڤوڠ بارو (Jawi); Chinese: 甘榜峇鲁; Tamil: கம்போங் பாரு
- Location: Jalan Haji Hassan Salleh, Kampung Baru; 50300 Kuala Lumpur; Malaysia
- Coordinates: 3°9′40″N 101°42′23″E
- System: Rapid KL
- Owner: Prasarana Malaysia
- Operator: Rapid Rail
- Line: 5 Kelana Jaya Line
- Platforms: 1 island platform
- Tracks: 2

Construction
- Structure type: Underground
- Parking: Not available

Other information
- Station code: KJ11

History
- Opened: 1 June 1999; 27 years ago

Services
Preceding station		Following station
KLCC towards Gombak	Kelana Jaya Line	Dang Wangi towards Putra Heights
Location

Kampung Baru LRT station, or Kampung Baru-Co-opbank Pertama LRT station under the station naming rights programme, is an underground light rapid transit (LRT) station, named after and serving Kampung Baru, Kuala Lumpur, in Malaysia. The station is part of the LRT Kelana Jaya Line. The station was opened on 1 June 1999, as part of the line's second, which included the addition of 12 stations to the line (not including Sri Rampai), and an underground line that the Kampung Baru station is connected to. The Kampung Baru station is currently one of only five underground stations on the Kelana Jaya Line.

== Location ==
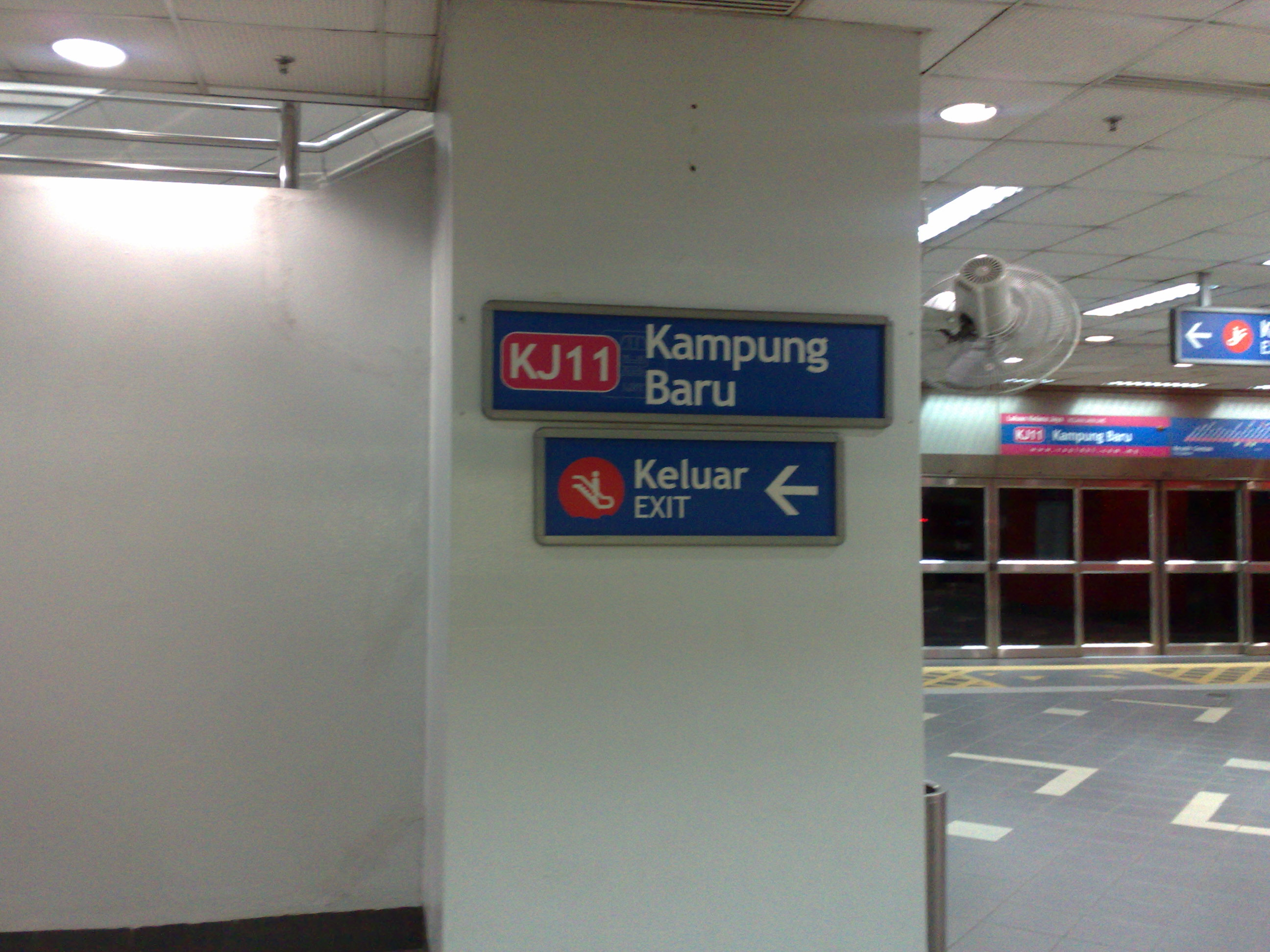
Previous station platform board prior to rebranding

Located on the southern edge of Kampung Baru, the station is located directly beside the Ampang–Kuala Lumpur Elevated Highway (AKLEH) and Klang River. The adjoining KLCC station, as is the Kuala Lumpur City Centre (KLCC) subdistrict itself, is situated across the Klang River, 700 metres away, and 130 metres away from the famous Saloma Link bridge that connects Kampung Baru residents to KLCC. The station is primarily intended to serve the Kampung Baru area.

== Layout and design ==
The station, like all other underground Kelana Jaya Line stations, is of a simplistic construction consisting of only three levels: the entrance at street level, and the concourse and platform levels underground. All levels are linked via escalators and stairways, while elevators are additionally provided between the concourse level and the platform level. The station contains only one island platform for two tracks of opposite directions, with floor-to-ceiling platform screen doors separating the platform from the tracks.

=== Exits and entrances ===
Kampung Baru station has a total of 2 entrances/exits to/from the street level - Entrance A at Jalan Sungai Baru and Entrance B at Lorong Raja Muda Musa 1. Entrance A is larger and is the primary entrance, equipped with a lift, escalators, ramps for wheelchair-using passengers and a mynews.com convenience store. Until 2025, Entrance A was the only access point into the station. Entrance B located just 40 m east from the main entrance and located beside the Saloma Link bridge, which was previously closed to the public until 2025, is smaller and has only escalators and stairs.

Kelana Jaya Line station
A	North side of Jalan Sungai Baru	Kampung Baru, Masjid Jamek Kampung Baru, Jalan Raja Abdullah, Jalan Raja Alang
B	West side of Lorong Raja Muda Musa 1	Saloma Link

== See also ==
- List of rail transit stations in Klang Valley
