= Kelana Jaya Line =

Rapid transit line in Kuala Lumpur, Malaysia

LRT Kelana Jaya Line

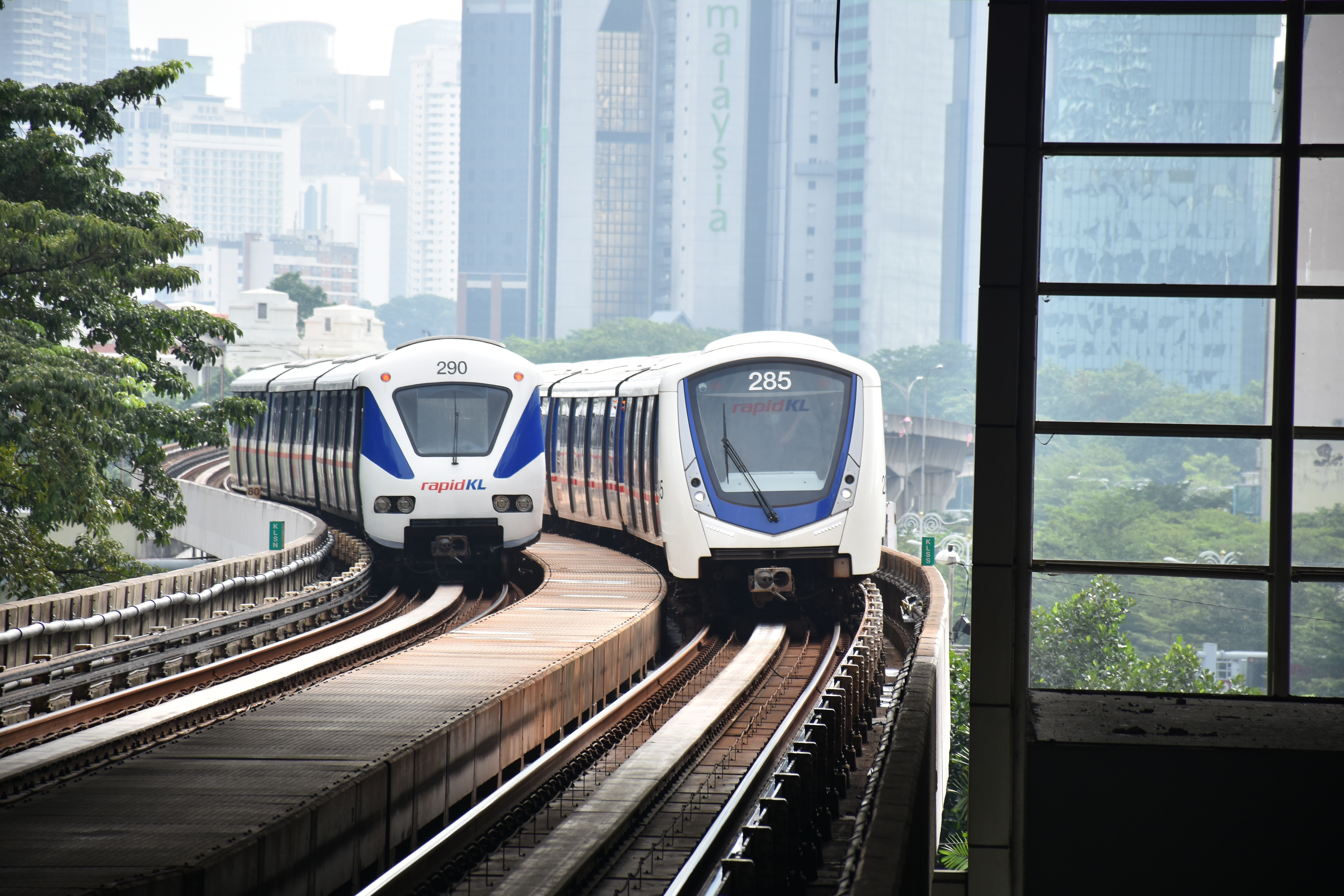
- Bombardier Innovia ART 200 (left) and Innovia Metro 300 (right) at the KL Sentral station

Overview
- Other name(s): LRT2, KJL, PUTRA Line
- Native name: LRT Laluan Kelana Jaya
- Status: Operational
- Owner: Prasarana Malaysia
- Line number: 5 (ruby)
- Locale: Klang Valley
- Termini: KJ1 Gombak; KJ37 Putra Heights
- Stations: 37
- Website: myrapid.com.my

Service
- Type: Light rapid transit
- System: Rapid KL; Klang Valley Integrated Transit System
- Services: Gombak–Putra Heights
- Operator: Rapid Rail
- Depot: Subang Depot
- Rolling stock: Alstom Innovia ART 200 & Metro 300; 266 carriages; 2-car & 4-car trainsets Width: 2.65 m (8 ft 8 in) - narrow profile Length: 67.1 m (220 ft) & 33.7 m (111 ft)
- Daily ridership: 289,297 (Q2 2026)
- Ridership: 89.63 million (2025) (▲5.8%); 94.66 million (2019; Highest)

History
- Opened: Phase 1: Kelana Jaya - Pasar Seni; 1 September 1998; 28 years ago Phase 2: Pasar Seni - Gombak; 1 June 1999; 27 years ago
- Last extension: Kelana Jaya - Putra Heights; 30 June 2016; 10 years ago

Technical
- Line length: 46.4 km (28.8 mi)
- Character: Mostly elevated Subsurface station(s): Sri Rampai; Underground station(s): Ampang Park - Masjid Jamek
- Track gauge: 1,435 mm (4 ft 8 1/2 in) standard gauge
- Electrification: 750 V DC third rail + linear induction motor
- Operating speed: 80 km/h (50 mph)
- Signalling: Alcatel/Thales SelTrac CBTC

The LRT Kelana Jaya Line is a light rapid transit (LRT) line and the first fully automated and driverless rail system in the Klang Valley, Malaysia. It forms part of the Klang Valley Integrated Transit System in and around Kuala Lumpur, Malaysia. Servicing 37 stations, the line has 46.4 km (28.8 mi) of grade-separated tracks running mostly on underground and elevated guideways. Formerly known as the PUTRA-LRT, it is operated as part of the Rapid KL system by Rapid Rail, a subsidiary of Prasarana Malaysia. The line is named after its former terminus, Kelana Jaya. The line is numbered 5 and coloured ruby on official transit maps.

== History ==
With the incorporation of Projek Usahasama Transit Ringan Automatik Sdn. Bhd. (PUTRA-LRT), construction began on 15 February 1994, several months after the Ampang Line began construction in late 1993. The tunnels were constructed by Hazama Corporation and Hyundai Engineering & Construction. Operations commenced on Section 1 from Subang Depot to Pasar Seni on 1 September 1998. Section 2 from Pasar Seni to Terminal PUTRA (now known as Gombak), which includes Malaysia's first underground railway, commenced operations on 1 June 1999.

Due to financial difficulties, PUTRA-LRT was wound up by the Kuala Lumpur High Court on 26 April 2002. By 1 September 2002, PUTRA-LRT came under the management of Prasarana Malaysia and renamed "Putraline" under the first phase of restructuring of Kuala Lumpur's public transport system. Prasarana Malaysia also took over STAR-LRT and renamed it "Starline". Operational aspects of the two lines are transferred to the new government-owned Rapid KL in November 2004 under the second phase of the restructuring process. Ownership of their assets remains with Prasarana Malaysia.

In July 2005, the line was rebranded as the Kelana Jaya Line, with all station signage changed by 2006.

=== Extensions ===
On 29 August 2006, then Malaysian Deputy Prime Minister Najib Razak announced that the western end of the line would be extended to the suburbs of Subang Jaya (USJ and Putra Heights) to the south-west of Kuala Lumpur. The extension would be part of a RM10 billion plan to expand Kuala Lumpur's public transport network.

The expansion plan would also see the LRT Sri Petaling Line extended to the suburbs of Puchong and the south-west of Kuala Lumpur. The plan also involved the construction of an entirely new LRT line, tentatively called the Kota Damansara–Cheras line, running from Kota Damansara in the western portion of the city, to Cheras in the southeast of Kuala Lumpur. (this has since been changed into MRT Kajang Line).

As of August 2008, Prasarana Malaysia was reportedly running land and engineering studies for the proposed extension.

In September 2009, Prasarana Malaysia began displaying the alignment of the proposed extensions over a 3-month period for feedback. The Kelana Jaya extension would have 13 new stations over 17 km (11 mi) from Kelana Jaya to Putra Heights. Construction was expected to commence in early 2010.

In November 2010, Prasarana Malaysia announced that it had awarded RM1.7 billion for first phase of the project. The winners included Trans Resource Corp Bhd for the Kelana Jaya Line extension. UEM Builders Bhd and Intria Bina Sdn Bhd were appointed as subcontractors for the fabrication and supply of segmental box girder jobs for the Kelana Jaya Line.

Construction works on the Kelana Jaya Line and the Sri Petaling Line extension project were targeted to accelerate at the end of March 2011, with commencement of structural works, subject to approval from state government and local authorities.

In 2014, completion of the extension was targeted for 2016. On 14 April 2016, Prasarana Malaysia confirmed in a media release that the Kelana line extension would be fully operating on 30 June 2016.

The extension begun operation on 30 June 2016, with 13 new stations added to the line beyond the Kelana Jaya terminus, the new terminus is now at Putra Heights, where the line meets with the LRT Sri Petaling Line.

== Line information ==
Route of Kelana Jaya Line

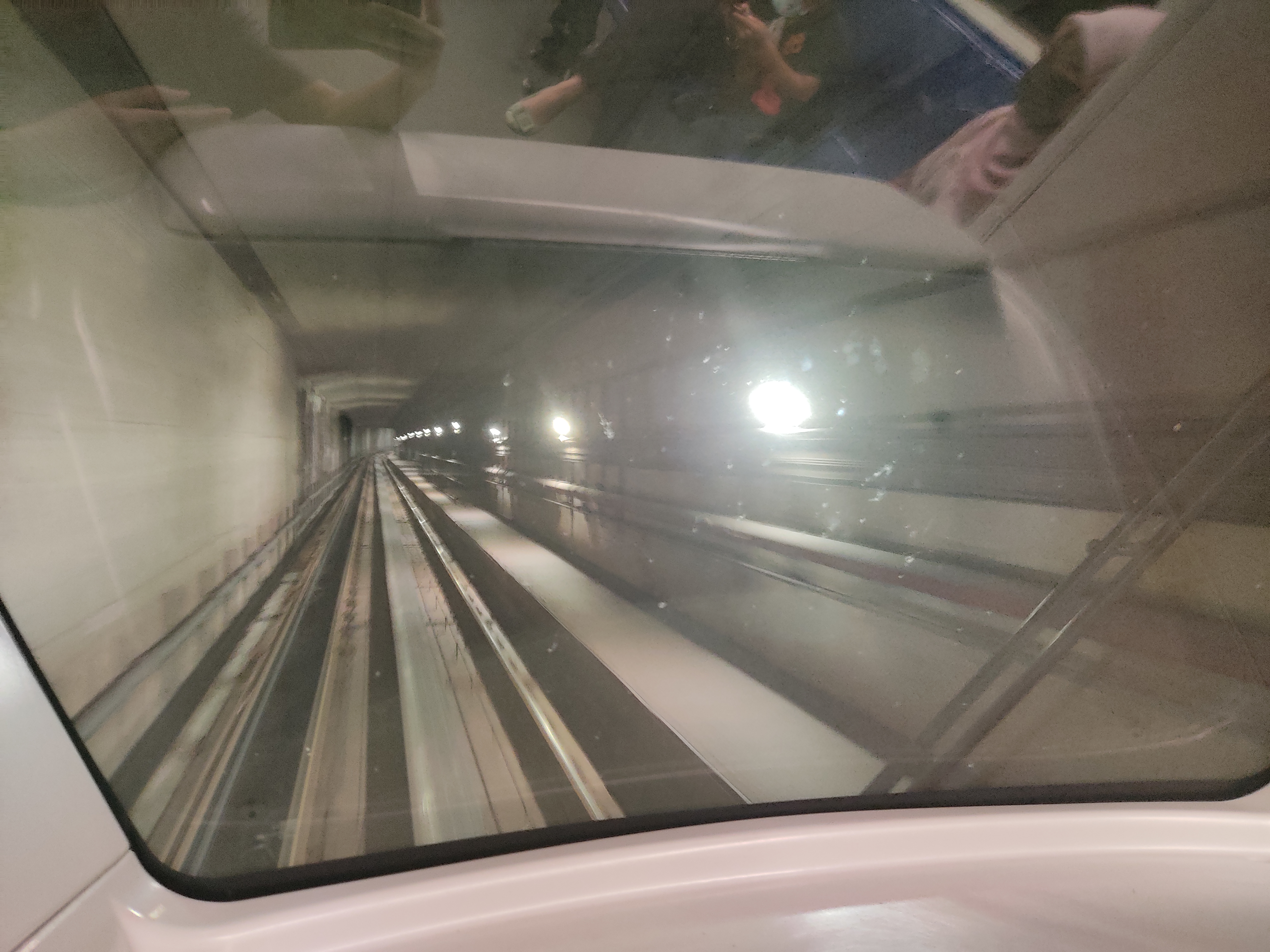
Underground LRT tunnel of the line with visible emergency sidewalk

The line runs from Putra Heights through Kelana Jaya to Gombak, serving the Subang Jaya and Petaling Jaya regions to the south; southwest and central Kuala Lumpur, and the Kuala Lumpur City Centre; and low-density residential areas further north. At 46.4 km (28.8 mi) in length, it is one of the longest fully automated driverless metro lines in the world.

The stations were built in a northeast–southwest direction, consisting primarily of elevated stops and a handful of underground and at-grade stations. Of the 37 stations, 31 are elevated, Sri Rampai lies at ground level, and five stops (Masjid Jamek, Dang Wangi, Kampung Baru, KLCC, and Ampang Park) are underground.

The stations, like those of the Ampang and Sri Petaling Lines, are styled in several types of architectural designs. Elevated stations, in most parts, were constructed in four major styles with distinctive roof designs for specific portions of the line. KL Sentral station, added later, features a design more consistent with the Stesen Sentral station building. Underground stations, however, tend to feature unique concourse layout and vestibules, and feature floor-to-ceiling platform screen doors to prevent platform-to-track intrusions. 22 stations (including two terminal stations and the five subway stations) use a single island platform, while 15 others use two side platforms. Stations with island platforms allow easy interchange between north-bound and south-bound trains without requiring one to walk down or up to the concourse level. The island platform at Putra Heights terminal station is shared with the Sri Petaling Line trains bound for Sentul Timur, allowing cross-platform line interchange at the station.

The stations were built to support disabled passengers, with elevators and wheelchair lifts alongside escalators and stairways between the levels. The stations have platform gaps smaller than 5 cm (2.0 in) to allow easy access for the disabled and wheelchair users. They are able to achieve this with:

- Tracks that are non-ballasted, lessening rail and train movements
- Trains that have direct rubber suspension, lessening train body movements
- Trains that do not rapidly run through stations
- Stations that have straight platforms

The stations on the Kelana Jaya Line are the earliest rapid transit stations in the Klang Valley designed to provide a degree of accessibility for handicapped users. In contrast, handicapped-friendly facilities for the Ampang and Sri Petaling Lines were installed beginning in 2012.

The stations have closed-circuit security cameras for security purposes.

== List of stations ==
| Station code | Station name | Images | Platform type | Position | Parking bays | Interchange station | Opening | Notes |
|---|---|---|---|---|---|---|---|---|
| KJ1 | Gombak | | Terminus (Island) | Elevated | MSPR: 1,441 | Northern terminus. Proposed connecting station with ECR East Coast Rail Link | 1 June 1999; 27 years ago | Formerly known as Terminal PUTRA. Parking is provided by a multi-storey park-and-ride, the only one on the Kelana Jaya Line, and is accessible only using TnG cards. |
| KJ2 | Taman Melati | | Side | Elevated | Parking by DBKL | | 1 June 1999; 27 years ago | |
| KJ3 | Wangsa Maju | | Island | Elevated | Parking by DBKL | | 1 June 1999; 27 years ago | Shuttle bus to the Tunku Abdul Rahman University of Management and Technology |
| KJ4 | Sri Rampai | | Side | Subsurface | Not available | | 24 December 2010; 15 years ago | Exit to Wangsa Walk Mall. |
| KJ5 | Setiawangsa | | Island | Elevated | 125 | Proposed interchange with CC15 MRT Circle Line | 1 June 1999; 27 years ago | |
| KJ6 | Jelatek | | Side | Elevated | 292 | | 1 June 1999; 27 years ago | Exit to Datum Jelatek Shopping Centre. |
| KJ7 | Dato' Keramat | | Side | Elevated | Not available | | 1 June 1999; 27 years ago | |
| KJ8 | Damai | | Island | Elevated | Not available | | 1 June 1999; 27 years ago | |
| KJ9 | Ampang Park | | Island | Underground | Not available | Connecting station with PY20 Putrajaya Line | 1 June 1999; 27 years ago | Exit to The Intermark Mall and The Linc KL. |
| KJ10 | KLCC | | Island | Underground | | | 1 June 1999; 27 years ago | Exit to the Petronas Twin Towers, Suria KLCC and Avenue K and the Kuala Lumpur Convention Centre. Pedestrian access to MR6 Bukit Bintang and MR7 Raja Chulan for the KL Monorail Line, and KG18A Bukit Bintang for the MRT Kajang Line via a pedestrian walkway connecting the Kuala Lumpur Convention Centre and Pavilion Kuala Lumpur mall. 7 mins walk (700 m) to PY21 Persiaran KLCC for the Putrajaya Line and Ombak KLCC via KLCC Park. 14 mins walk to KJ11 Kampung Baru via Saloma Bridge (behind Jalan Ampang Muslim Cemetery) which is accessible at Jalan Saloma (the road beside Menara Public Bank). 15 mins walk to PY22 Conlay via the Kuala Lumpur Convention Centre. |
| KJ11 | Kampung Baru–Co-opbank Pertama | | Island | Underground | Not available | | 1 June 1999; 27 years ago | 14 mins walk to KJ10 KLCC via Saloma Bridge. |
| KJ12 | Dang Wangi | | Island | Underground | Not available | Connecting station to MR8 Bukit Nanas for the KL Monorail | 1 June 1999; 27 years ago | |
| KJ13 | Masjid Jamek | | Island | Underground | Not available | Interchange station with AG7 SP7 Ampang and Sri Petaling lines. | 1 June 1999; 27 years ago | Exit to Dataran Merdeka. |
| KJ14 | Pasar Seni | | Island | Elevated | Not available | Interchange station with KG16 Kajang Line. Connecting station to KA02 Kuala Lumpur for the KTM Batu Caves-Pulau Sebang Line, KTM Tanjung Malim-Port Klang Line and KTM ETS | 1 September 1998; 28 years ago | Bus hub to Puchong, Subang Airport, Petaling Jaya, Shah Alam and Subang Jaya. Exit to Central Market, Kuala Lumpur and Chinatown. |
| KJ15 | KL Sentral–redONE | | Side | Elevated | Parking By KL Sentral | Connecting station with: KA01 KS01 KTM Batu Caves-Pulau Sebang Line, KTM Tanjung Malim-Port Klang Line, KTM ETS; KE1 ERL KLIA Ekspres; KT1 ERL KLIA Transit; KG15 Muzium Negara on the Kajang Line via an 850-metre underground passageway from the main KL Sentral terminal building; MR1 KL Sentral Monorail on the KL Monorail Line via a linkbridge from NU Sentral Mall, accessed from the KL Sentral Main terminal building | 16 April 2001; 25 years ago | Exit to NU Sentral Mall |
| KJ16 | Bangsar–Bank Rakyat | | Side | Elevated | Not available | | 1 September 1998; 28 years ago | |
| KJ17 | Abdullah Hukum | Abdullah Hukum LRT Station outview (220709) 02 | Side | Elevated | Not available | Connecting station with KD01 KTM Tanjung Malim-Port Klang Line. | 1 September 1998; 28 years ago | Link-bridge access to KB01 Mid Valley for the KTM Batu Caves-Pulau Sebang Line via KL Eco City, The Gardens Mall & Mid Valley Megamall. |
| KJ18 | Kerinchi | | Side | Elevated | Not available | | 1 September 1998; 28 years ago | |
| KJ19 | Universiti | | | Elevated | Not available | Proposed connecting station with CC32 MRT Circle Line | 1 September 1998; 28 years ago | Rapid KL Bus T789 to University of Malaya and T788 to KB01 Mid Valley on the KTM Batu Caves-Pulau Sebang Line. Exit to KL Gateway Mall. |
| KJ20 | Taman Jaya | | Side | Elevated | Not available | | 1 September 1998; 28 years ago | Exit to The Amcorp Mall. |
| KJ21 | Asia Jaya | | Island | Elevated | Parking by MBPJ | | 1 September 1998; 28 years ago | |
| KJ22 | Taman Paramount | | Side | Elevated | 68 | | 1 September 1998; 28 years ago | |
| KJ23 | Taman Bahagia | | Side | Elevated | Parking by MBPJ | | 1 September 1998; 28 years ago | |
| KJ24 | Kelana Jaya | | Island | Elevated | 482 | | 1 September 1998; 28 years ago | Bus hub to KT3 PY41 Putrajaya Sentral (506), Subang Jaya (783), Sunway Pyramid (783) and Bandar Utama (506/802). |
| KJ25 | Lembah Subang | | Side | Elevated | Not available | | 30 June 2016; 10 years ago | The station is located on top of the existing Lembah Subang depot reception track ramp. Feeder Bus T807 to KG07 Surian for the Kajang Line. Bus to Menara Prasarana (for staff only) |
| KJ26 | Ara Damansara | | Island | Elevated | 817 | | 30 June 2016; 10 years ago | Exit to Evolve Concept Mall. |
| KJ27 | Glenmarie | | Island | Elevated | 569 | Connecting station with SA07 Shah Alam Line. | 30 June 2016; 10 years ago | |
| KJ28 | Subang Jaya | | Island | Elevated | Parking by KTMB | Connecting station with KD09 KS02 KTM Tanjung Malim-Port Klang Line and KTM KL Sentral-Terminal Skypark Line | 30 June 2016; 10 years ago | |
| KJ29 | SS15 | | Island | Elevated | Not available | | 30 June 2016; 10 years ago | Exit to SS15 Courtyard, INTI International University Subang Campus and Subang Square. |
| KJ30 | SS18 | | Island | Elevated | Not available | | 30 June 2016; 10 years ago | |
| KJ31 | USJ 7 | | Island | Elevated | Not available | Interchange station with SB7 BRT Sunway Line. | 30 June 2016; 10 years ago | Exit to Easyhome Mall and The Summit USJ. |
| KJ32 | Taipan | | Side | Elevated | Not available | | 30 June 2016; 10 years ago | |
| KJ33 | Wawasan | | Side | Elevated | Not available | | 30 June 2016; 10 years ago | Exit to 19 USJ City Mall and Rhytme Avenue Residence |
| KJ34 | USJ 21 | | Side | Elevated | 694 | | 30 June 2016; 10 years ago | Exit to Main Place Mall and Main Place Residence |
| KJ35 | Alam Megah | | Island | Elevated | 196 | | 30 June 2016; 10 years ago | |
| KJ36 | Subang Alam | | Island | Elevated | 115 | | 30 June 2016; 10 years ago | 26-minute walk to Maple Leaf Kingsley International School |
| KJ37 | Putra Heights | | Terminus (Island & Side) | Elevated | 452 | Southern terminus. Cross-platform interchange with SP31 Sri Petaling Line. | 30 June 2016; 10 years ago | Southern terminus of both the Kelana Jaya Line and Sri Petaling Line. |

== Rolling stock ==
=== 2-car 1998 Innovia ART 200 ( September 1998- November 2023) ===
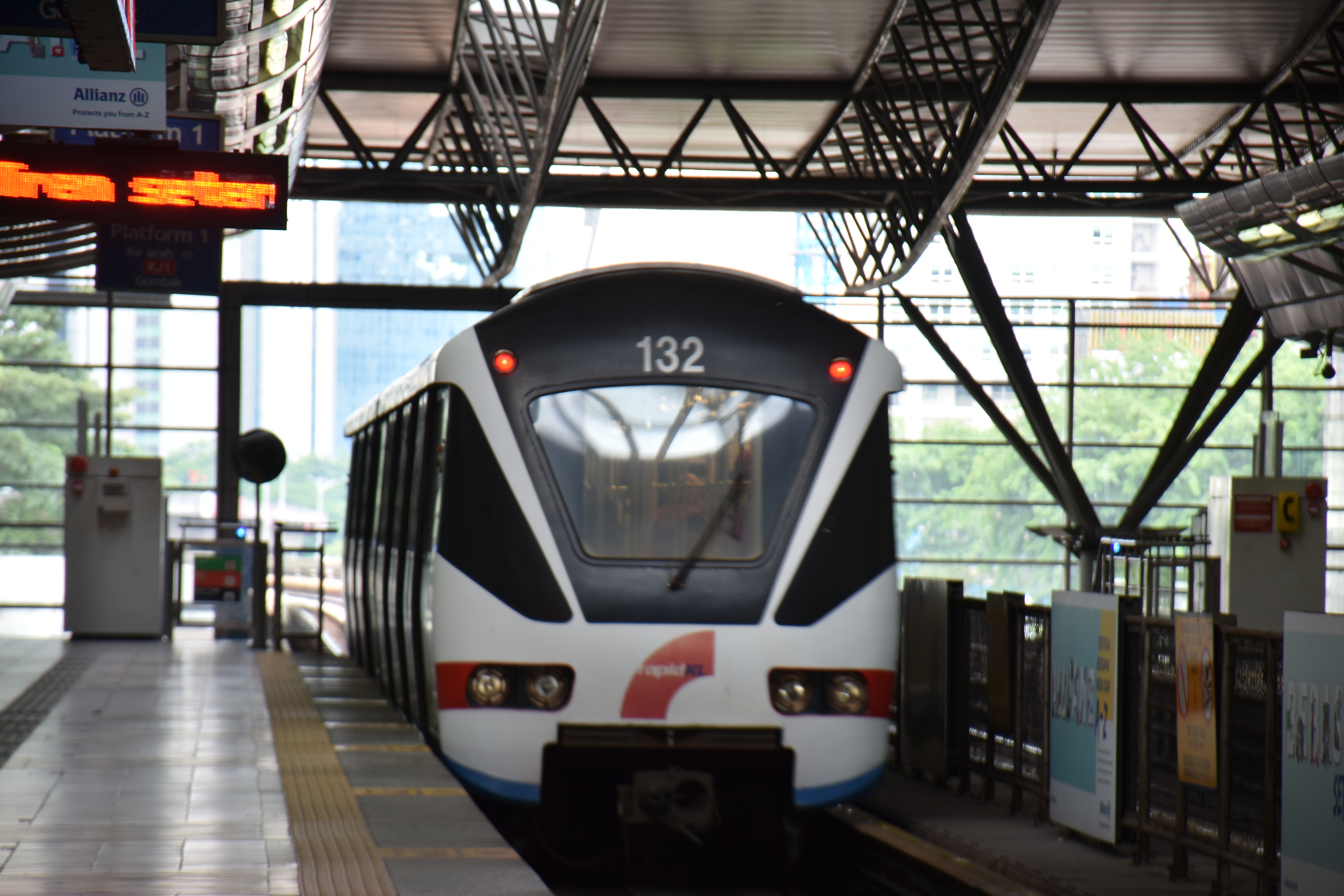
An unrefurbished 2-car Bombardier Innovia ART 200

The rolling stock which was in use since the opening of the line in 1998 until 2023, consisted of 35 Innovia ART 200 trains with related equipment and services supplied by the Bombardier Group and train electronics company Quester Tangent. They consisted of two-electric multiple units, which served as either a driving car or trailer car depending on the direction of travel. They were equipped with Linear Induction Motor (LIM) propulsion technology which allowed for operation on tighter curves, with less noise and greatly reduced wheel and track wear. The plating in between the running rails was used for accelerating and decelerating the train; additionally, the reaction plate was semi-magnetised, which pulls the train along and helps it slow down.

The ART was completely automated and operates without drivers, stopping at stations for a limited amount of time. Nevertheless, manual override control panels were provided at each end of the trains for use in an event of an emergency. The technology was essentially identical to that of the Vancouver SkyTrain, which operates in very similar environments.

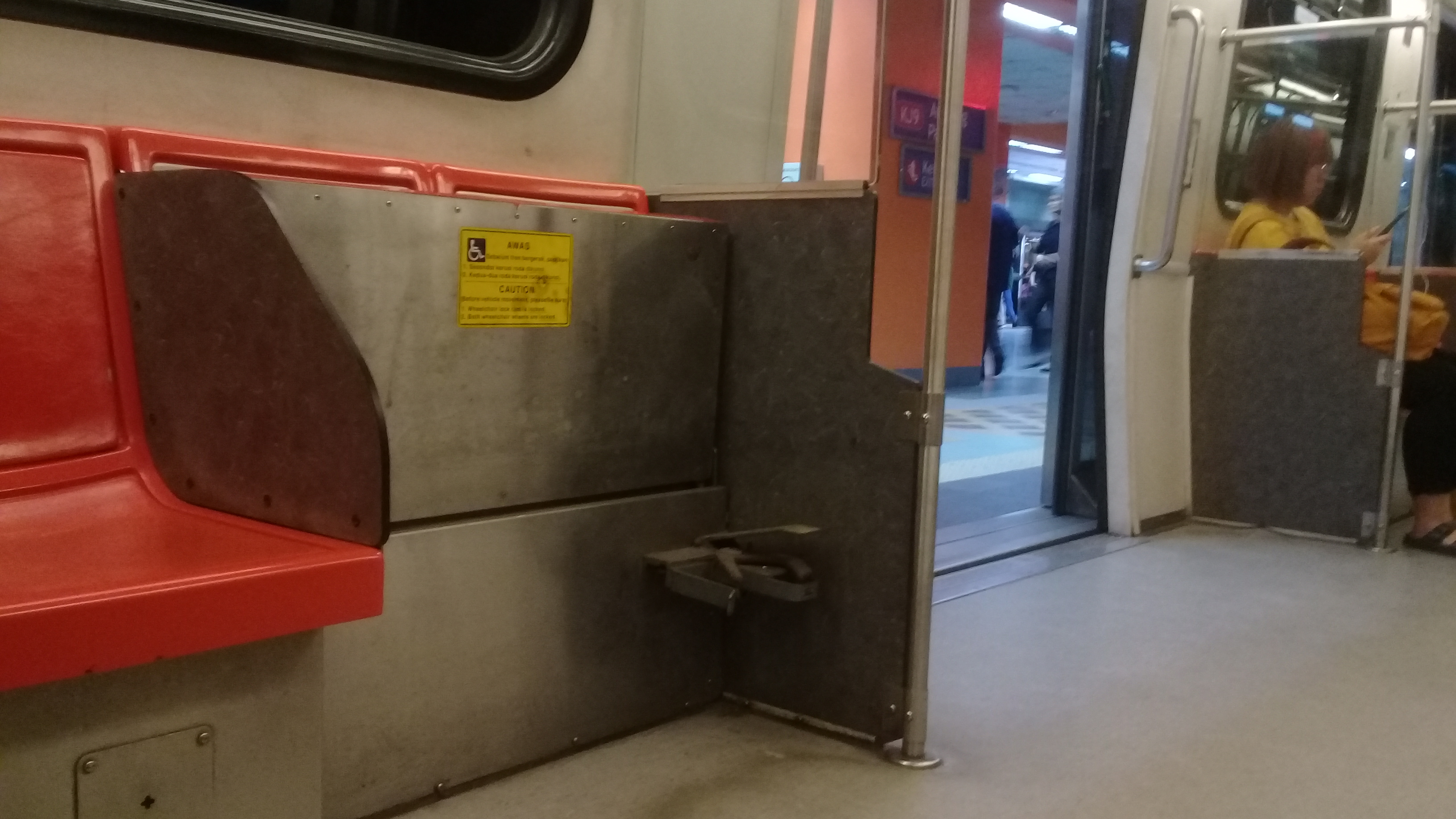
The foldable seat to make space for wheelchairs and strollers inside Innovia ART 200

The interior of the ART, like its Ampang and Sri Petaling Lines' counterparts, consists of plastic seating aligned sideways towards the sides of the train, with one foldable seats for passengers at the end of the cars for wheelchair, and spacing in the middle for standing occupants. Since its launch in 1998, the ART rolling stock has remained relatively unchanged; only more holding straps have been added and the labeling has been modified from Putra-LRT to Rapid KL. Some of the rolling stock has the majority of the seats removed for added passenger capacity during rush hours.

With the fleet being aged, a tender was released by Prasarana in 2023 for the disposal of 4 2-car trains.

On 23 May 2023, two-car train Number 32 was sent to Megalift, which handled logistics for the train's relocation. Train 32 was repurposed as a prop for disaster management training. It will form part of the simulation site at Pulau Meranti for the Malaysian Search & Rescue Team (SMART) to train on.

In November 2023, all un-refurbished 2-car trains had been fully withdrawn from service.

=== 4-car 2009 Innovia ART 200 ===
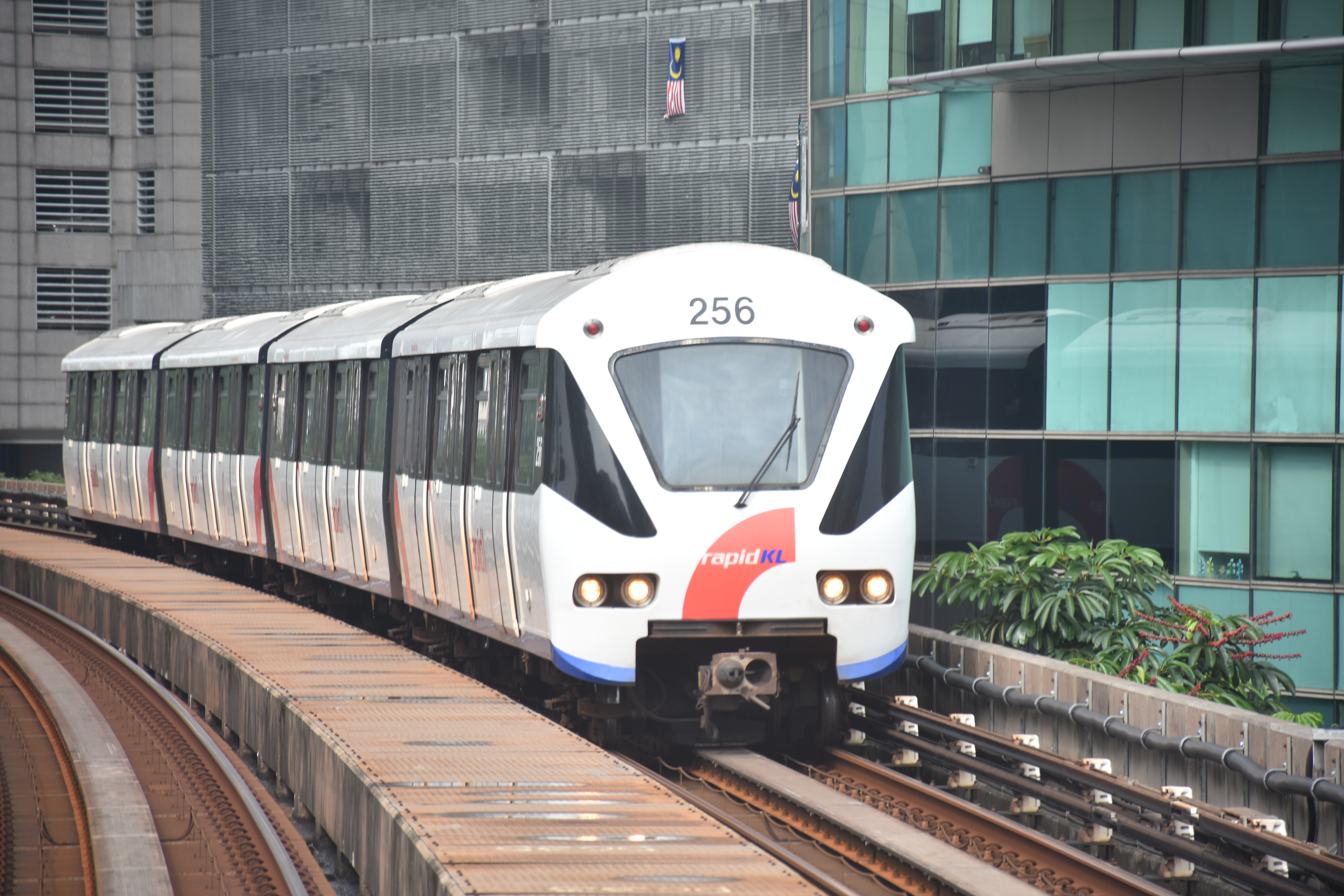
4-car Bombardier Innovia ART 200

On 13 October 2006, Syarikat Prasarana Negara signed an agreement with Bombardier HARTASUMA Consortium for the purchase of 88 Innovia ART 200 cars (22 train sets of 4-cars), with an option for another 13, for RM1.2 billion. The 22 train sets, initially targeted to be delivered from August 2008 onwards, would have four cars each, boosting the carrying capacity of the fleet by 1,500 people. On 7 October 2007, Syarikat Prasarana Negara exercised its option to purchase an additional 52 Innovia ART 200 cars (13 train sets of 4-cars) for €71 million. The first trains were expected to enter revenue service in 2010.

Although the trains were expected to arrive in August 2008, the manufacturer delayed the delivery to November 2008. Rapid Rail said that the trains will only be usable by September 2009 after having sufficient rolling stocks, power line upgrades, and safety testing. Transport Minister Datuk Seri Ong Tee Keat said in Parliament that the new trains would begin operations by December 2009. However, in July 2009, Prime Minister Najib Tun Razak announced that the four-car trains would only be fully operational by the end of 2012.

On 30 December 2009, 3 of the 35 new four-car trains entered commercial service. In addition to increased capacity up to 950 passengers per trip, new features included seat belts for wheelchair-using travelers, door alarm lights for hearing impaired, and more handles for standing commuters.

=== 2-coach Mid-Life Refurbishment ===
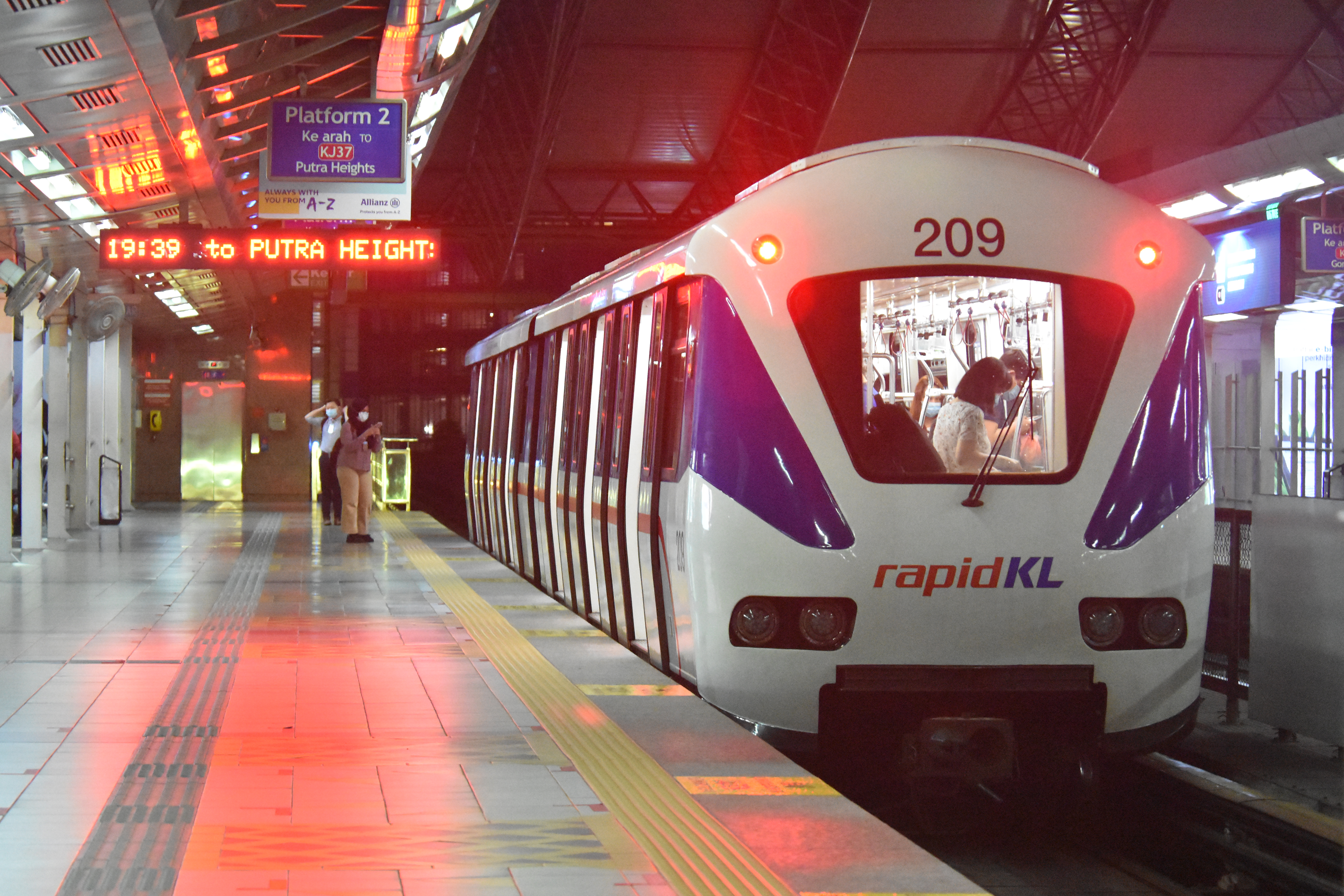
Bombardier Innovia ART 200 MLR set

In June 2012, several 2-car Innovia ART 200 trains underwent major refurbishment work done by Hartasuma Consortium. Known as Mid-Life Refurbishments (MLR), these refurbishments include an updated livery, changes of the LED headlights and interior lights, and interior refurbishments such as newer seat design and the installation of additional infotainment systems. Facilities were also added, such as openable windows during emergencies. The first MLR set, TR08, entered service on 15 October 2014.

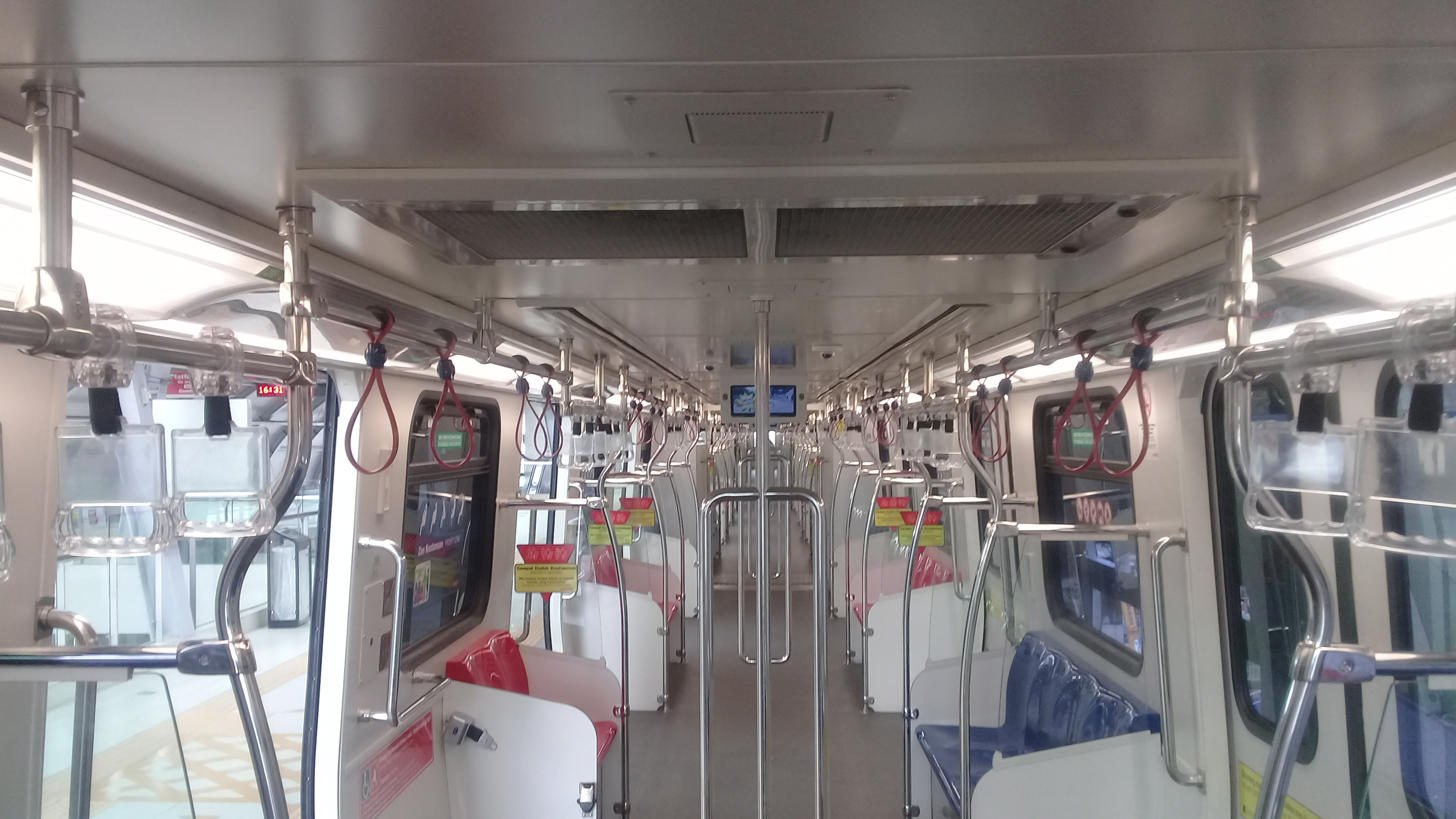
Interior of the refurbished set

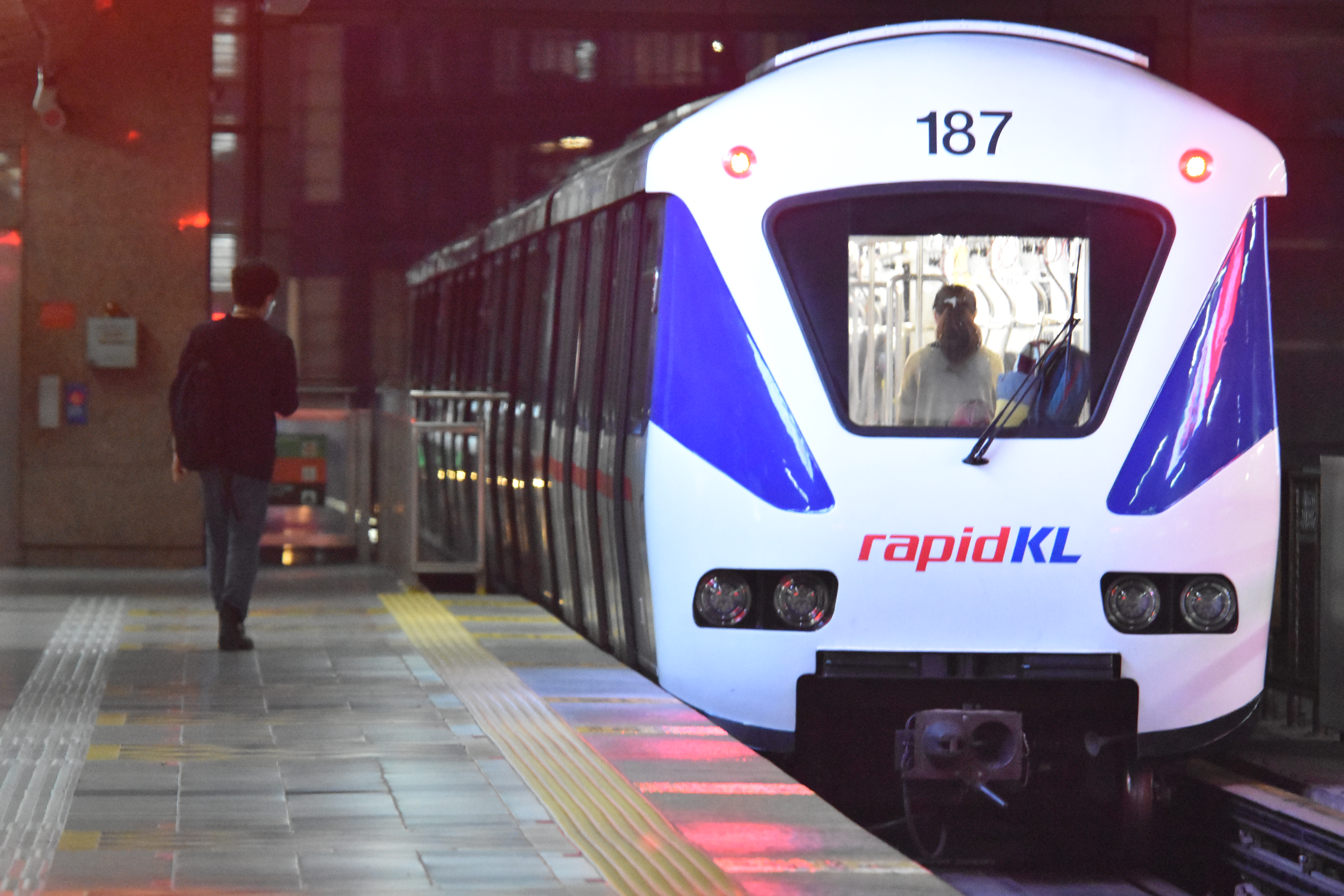
A 'married train' of the Innovia ART 200 MLR set 87

In 2017, another MLR project included two 2-car sets permanently coupled to form a 4-car set, known as the 'married train'. Interiors were similar to the previous MLR sets with added TV panels at each end of the sets, dynamic route map displays and walk-through gangways between the two sets. The first coupled train, TR87 (previously TR22 and TR27), entered service on 29 December 2017, with the remaining undergoing delivery in stages.

Since the delivery of the new KLAV27 trains, the remaining 2-car trains that are not refurbished will be replaced by the new trains. As of now, only 20 2-car trains are refurbished (including married trains).

=== KLAV Innovia Metro 300 ===
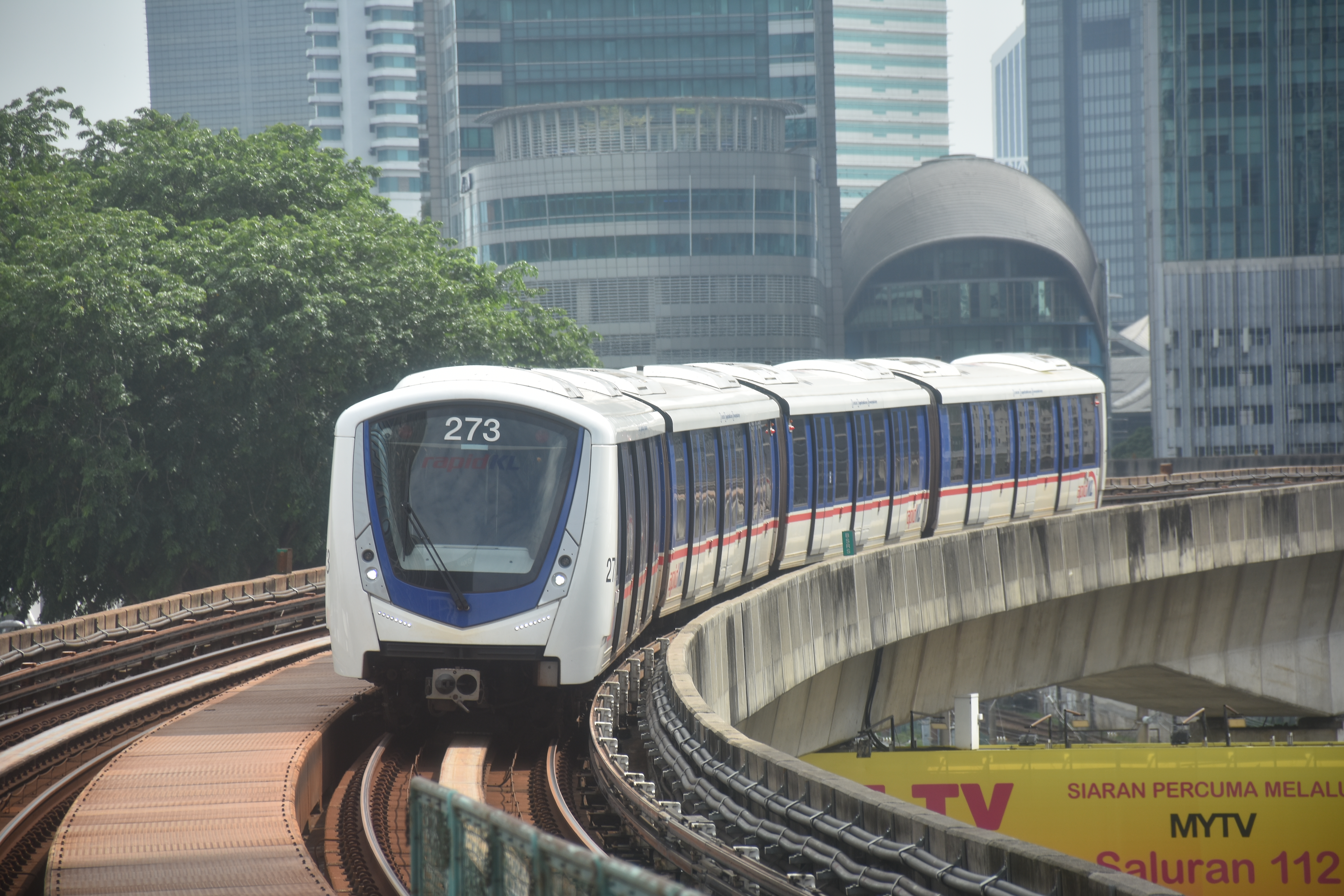
Bombardier Innovia Metro 300, known as KLAV

Under the Kuala Lumpur Additional Vehicle programme, the first new generation Bombardier Innovia Metro 300 started service on 29 December 2016. Each driverless train features a new design for the end caps, a curved sidewall structure, and a larger, more spacious interior. All trains come in a four-car configuration with each car accommodating up to 220 passengers. Low energy consumption is achieved through a combination of lightweight aluminium car shells and a LIM propulsion system. Furthermore, the vehicle's regenerative braking enables the reuse of energy released during braking. The aisles and walk-through gangways are also wider when compared with the previous fleet. In addition, the trainsets are equipped with 16 cameras on board, infotainment LCD screens, dynamic route maps, better air-conditioning and bigger windows. With the new trains, the line could increase its capacity by 20 to 30 percent.

An additional 27 new trainsets are being delivered. As of August 2020, three have arrived with two of them under installation. They were delivered for the first time by air using an Antonov An-124, one of the largest cargo planes in existence. The rest of the fleet are to be delivered by ship. Since 27 June 2021, two trainsets labelled Sets 92 and 93 were spotted to be in service on the line. (Note: There was no explicit mention of when these trains were officially serving passengers, so the closest date cited in public news sites was mentioned.) As of 14 September 2023, three trains in addition to the eight introduced previously are in operation. (Note: Although news outlets quoted 3 trains to be in service on 14 September 2023, observations, however were different where the first train number 33 debuted on 17 August 2023.)

=== 4-coach Mid-Life Refurbishment (canceled) ===
Due to recent developments in numerous breakdowns involving the 4-coach ART 200 fleet, it was revealed by Rapid KL that mid-life refurbishment is to be done on the 34 trains. (Note: Various published sources quoted differing numbers from May 2022 to the present (in 2023), but the most recent source quoted 34. The only train to be excluded would be Train 40 due to the major collision in 2021.) According to former Transport Minister Wee Ka Siong, faulty or dated equipments included tachometers, electronic units and antennas. The most serious contributor to faults were from tachometers, accounting up to 47%. This refurbishment was expected to cost RM 800 million in May 2022.

=== Upcoming fleet refreshment ===
Under Budget 2026, RM1 billion (US$246 million) has been allocated for the procurement of 26 new train sets for the Kelana Jaya line to improve reliability and capacity of the line. The new trainsets from CRRC are expected to arrive in 2028, with the first sets targeted in September of that year. In April 2026, it was updated that the first sets are targeted to arrive by 2029, with the new fleet of trains expected to be fully in service by 2031.

This will be the second time any of the six existing linear induction systems built under the Innovia platform will have consulted a manufacturer solely outside of Bombardier (and by extension, Alstom) for new rolling stock.

=== Fleet details ===
The Kelana Jaya Line fleet consists of the following models:

| Innovia Series | Generation | Number built | Formation | Manufacturers | Notes |
|---|---|---|---|---|---|
| INNOVIA ART 200 | 414 Series (unrefurbished) | 35 trainsets | 2-cars | Bombardier Transportation | Retired. Operated from 1998 until 2023. |
| INNOVIA ART 200 | 414 Series (refurbished) | 10 trainsets | 2-cars | Bombardier Transportation | In operation since 2014. |
| INNOVIA ART 200 | 414 Series (refurbished) | 5 trainsets | 4-cars | Bombardier Transportation | Refurbished two 2-car sets into one 4-car set. Operated from 2017 until 2024, retired due to unreliability |
| INNOVIA ART 200 | 818 Series | 35 trainsets | 4-cars | Bombardier Transportation | In operation since the end of 2009. To be decommissioned and replaced with the upcoming CRRC trains between late-2020s until early-2030s. |
| INNOVIA Metro 300 | KLAV14 | 14 trainsets | 4-cars | Bombardier Transportation | In operation since the end of 2016. |
| INNOVIA Metro 300 | KLAV27 | 27 trainsets | 4-cars | Alstom | In operation since 2021. Replaced unrefurbished 414 series trains. |

The old RM10 banknote of the 1996 series featured an image of the 2-car Bombardier Innovia ART 200 Kelana Jaya Line train.

== Accidents and incidents ==
On 24 July 2006, failure of the back-up computer caused the line to stop functioning during the evening rush hour. Passengers were trapped in trains and some forced opened doors in order to get out.

On 4 March 2018, a high-voltage power line broke and fell on the roof of the Kelana Jaya, causing the roof to be blown off. Trains on both routes passed through the station while it was closed for repairs. The Kelana Jaya station reopened a few days later.

In November 2022, a series of service disruptions caused by faulty automatic train control (ATC) device(s) forced trains to move slower and stop longer than usual, especially between Kelana Jaya and KLCC stations.

On 5 November 2022, a fault occurred between KLCC and Ampang Park stations. Rapid KL resolved the problem by updating the software of the faulty ATC device, and train service resumed as usual on 6 November 2022. The problem resurfaced again between KLCC and Kelana Jaya stations on the evening of 7 November 2022. Stations between Damai and Lembah Subang were closed at night to resolve the ATC stability issues. However, the same problem recurred on the evening of 8 November 2022, leading to a 4-day suspension. Prasarana carried out the repairs, including finding the root cause of the problem. After the subsequent stability tests under the supervision of technical experts from Thales Group and the Land Public Transport Agency, the Ampang Park-Kelana Jaya stretch re-opened on 14 November 2022, two days earlier than expected.

=== 2021 underground collision ===
On 24 May 2021, at 8:45 pm MYT, train number 81 and 40 collided with each other between the KLCC and Kampung Baru stations. Both trains were traveling in opposite directions on the same track and collided head-on. One of the trains was under maintenance and was being driven manually on the wrong track, while the other was automatically driven from KLCC. The cab ends which collided were carriages 181 and 240. A total of 213 people were on board the automated train. Preliminary reports indicated that no fewer than 166 people were injured, 47 of which were serious; no deaths were reported, but with 64 people requiring hospitalization, with 6 in critical condition. The case is under investigation as of 25 May 2021. This is the only and most severe incident involving a collision between two trains to occur along the Kelana Jaya line since it first opened in 1999.

A section of Train 81 involved in the accident was preserved as part of the Malaysia Agriculture, Horticulture and Agrotourism Exhibition in Serdang, Selangor from August 28 to September 6, 2026.

== Ridership ==
In 2002, the line carried its 150 millionth passenger, with an average of passengers daily. As of early 2025, it carries over 250,000 passengers per day and over 350,000 per day during national events.

Kelana Jaya Line Ridership
| Year | Month/Quarter | Ridership | Annual Ridership | Change (%) | Note |
|---|---|---|---|---|---|
| 2026 | Q4 | 7,731,700 | 74,621,494 | | As of October 2026 |
| 2026 | Q3 | 23,328,638 | 74,621,494 | | |
| 2026 | Q2 | 22,130,471 | 74,621,494 | | |
| 2026 | Q1 | 21,430,685 | 74,621,494 | | |
| 2025 | Q4 | 22,940,996 | 89,632,502 | ▲5.8 | |
| 2025 | Q3 | 23,475,523 | 89,632,502 | ▲5.8 | |
| 2025 | Q2 | 21,872,411 | 89,632,502 | ▲5.8 | |
| 2025 | Q1 | 21,343,572 | 89,632,502 | ▲5.8 | |
| 2024 | Q4 | 22,703,042 | 84,733,297 | ▲14.9 | |
| 2024 | Q3 | 22,056,998 | 84,733,297 | ▲14.9 | |
| 2024 | Q2 | 20,208,082 | 84,733,297 | ▲14.9 | |
| 2024 | Q1 | 19,765,175 | 84,733,297 | ▲14.9 | |
| 2023 | Q4 | 19,934,860 | 73,763,592 | ▲34.1 | |
| 2023 | Q3 | 19,115,670 | 73,763,592 | ▲34.1 | |
| 2023 | Q2 | 17,408,097 | 73,763,592 | ▲34.1 | |
| 2023 | Q1 | 17,304,965 | 73,763,592 | ▲34.1 | |
| 2022 | Q4 | 15,683,914 | 55,015,765 | ▲119 | |
| 2022 | Q3 | 16,308,645 | 55,015,765 | ▲119 | |
| 2022 | Q2 | 13,581,618 | 55,015,765 | ▲119 | |
| 2022 | Q1 | 9,441,588 | 55,015,765 | ▲119 | |
| 2021 | Q4 | 8,654,720 | 25,123,614 | ▼44.5 | Total lockdown |
| 2021 | Q3 | 3,625,040 | 25,123,614 | ▼44.5 | Total lockdown |
| 2021 | Q2 | 16,004,641 | 25,123,614 | ▼44.5 | Total lockdown |
| 2021 | Q1 | 6,839,213 | 25,123,614 | ▼44.5 | Total lockdown |
| 2020 | Q4 | 8,085,625 | 45,307,182 | ▼52.1 | COVID-19 pandemic |
| 2020 | Q3 | 12,658,879 | 45,307,182 | ▼52.1 | COVID-19 pandemic |
| 2020 | Q2 | 4,573,760 | 45,307,182 | ▼52.1 | COVID-19 pandemic |
| 2020 | Q1 | 19,988,918 | 45,307,182 | ▼52.1 | COVID-19 pandemic |
| 2019 | Q4 | 25,046,142 | 94,657,974 | ▲8.5 | Highest on record |
| 2019 | Q3 | 24,124,173 | 94,657,974 | ▲8.5 | Highest on record |
| 2019 | Q2 | 22,935,918 | 94,657,974 | ▲8.5 | Highest on record |
| 2019 | Q1 | 22,551,741 | 94,657,974 | ▲8.5 | Highest on record |
| 2018 | Q4 | 22,592,312 | 87,216,597 | ▲4.3 | |
| 2018 | Q3 | 22,063,841 | 87,216,597 | ▲4.3 | |
| 2018 | Q2 | 21,268,728 | 87,216,597 | ▲4.3 | |
| 2018 | Q1 | 21,291,716 | 87,216,597 | ▲4.3 | |
| 2017 | Q4 | 21,554,755 | 83,585,412 | ▲5.8 | |
| 2017 | Q3 | 21,893,742 | 83,585,412 | ▲5.8 | |
| 2017 | Q2 | 19,999,248 | 83,585,412 | ▲5.8 | |
| 2017 | Q1 | 20,137,667 | 83,585,412 | ▲5.8 | |
| 2016 | Q4 | 20,414,724 | 79,002,829 | ▼3.8 | |
| 2016 | Q3 | 20,305,695 | 79,002,829 | ▼3.8 | |
| 2016 | Q2 | 19,177,217 | 79,002,829 | ▼3.8 | KJ24 Kelana Jaya – KJ37 Putra Heights extension opened on 30 June 2016 |
| 2016 | Q1 | 19,105,193 | 79,002,829 | ▼3.8 | |
| 2015 | Q4 | 20,535,294 | 82,144,674 | ▲0.2 | |
| 2015 | Q3 | 20,750,023 | 82,144,674 | ▲0.2 | |
| 2015 | Q2 | 20,817,446 | 82,144,674 | ▲0.2 | |
| 2015 | Q1 | 20,041,911 | 82,144,674 | ▲0.2 | |
| 2014 | Q4 | 21,224,532 | 81,971,322 | ▲4.2 | |
| 2014 | Q3 | 20,774,079 | 81,971,322 | ▲4.2 | |
| 2014 | Q2 | 20,594,483 | 81,971,322 | ▲4.2 | |
| 2014 | Q1 | 19,378,228 | 81,971,322 | ▲4.2 | |
| 2013 | Q4 | 20,223,187 | 78,702,931 | ▲10 | |
| 2013 | Q3 | 19,906,746 | 78,702,931 | ▲10 | |
| 2013 | Q2 | 19,937,822 | 78,702,931 | ▲10 | |
| 2013 | Q1 | 18,635,176 | 78,702,931 | ▲10 | |
| 2012 | Q4 | 18,685,296 | 71,574,675 | ▲4.6 | |
| 2012 | Q3 | 18,091,456 | 71,574,675 | ▲4.6 | |
| 2012 | Q2 | 17,888,831 | 71,574,675 | ▲4.6 | |
| 2012 | Q1 | 16,909,092 | 71,574,675 | ▲4.6 | |
| 2011 | Q4 | 16,811,829 | 68,398,561 | ▲17.9 | |
| 2011 | Q3 | 18,096,333 | 68,398,561 | ▲17.9 | |
| 2011 | Q2 | 17,799,386 | 68,398,561 | ▲17.9 | |
| 2011 | Q1 | 15,691,013 | 68,398,561 | ▲17.9 | |
| 2010 | Q4 | 13,279,383 | 56,806,835 | ▲4.4 | |
| 2010 | Q3 | 14,350,605 | 56,806,835 | ▲4.4 | |
| 2010 | Q2 | 15,035,679 | 56,806,835 | ▲4.4 | |
| 2010 | Q1 | 14,141,168 | 56,806,835 | ▲4.4 | |
| 2009 | Q4 | 14,492,169 | 55,607,233 | ▼4.4 | |
| 2009 | Q3 | 14,190,663 | 55,607,233 | ▼4.4 | |
| 2009 | Q2 | 13,712,008 | 55,607,233 | ▼4.4 | |
| 2009 | Q1 | 13,212,393 | 55,607,233 | ▼4.4 | |
| 2008 | Q4 | 14,381,963 | 58,168,337 | ▲2.1 | |
| 2008 | Q3 | 15,593,981 | 58,168,337 | ▲2.1 | |
| 2008 | Q2 | 14,036,402 | 58,168,337 | ▲2.1 | |
| 2008 | Q1 | 14,155,991 | 58,168,337 | ▲2.1 | |
| 2007 | Q4 | | 56,965,258 | ▲0.4 | |
| 2007 | Q3 | | 56,965,258 | ▲0.4 | |
| 2007 | Q2 | | 56,965,258 | ▲0.4 | |
| 2007 | Q1 | | 56,965,258 | ▲0.4 | |
| 2006 | Q4 | | 56,747,136 | ▼5.9 | |
| 2006 | Q3 | | 56,747,136 | ▼5.9 | |
| 2006 | Q2 | | 56,747,136 | ▼5.9 | |
| 2006 | Q1 | | 56,747,136 | ▼5.9 | |
| 2005 | Q4 | | 60,290,467 | ▲4.4 | |
| 2005 | Q3 | | 60,290,467 | ▲4.4 | |
| 2005 | Q2 | | 60,290,467 | ▲4.4 | |
| 2005 | Q1 | | 60,290,467 | ▲4.4 | |
| 2004 | Q4 | | 57,729,971 | ▲14.9 | |
| 2004 | Q3 | | 57,729,971 | ▲14.9 | |
| 2004 | Q2 | | 57,729,971 | ▲14.9 | |
| 2004 | Q1 | | 57,729,971 | ▲14.9 | |
| 2003 | Q4 | | 50,254,365 | ▼7.7 | |
| 2003 | Q3 | | 50,254,365 | ▼7.7 | |
| 2003 | Q2 | | 50,254,365 | ▼7.7 | |
| 2003 | Q1 | | 50,254,365 | ▼7.7 | |
| 2002 | Q4 | | 54,423,246 | ▲3.7 | |
| 2002 | Q3 | | 54,423,246 | ▲3.7 | |
| 2002 | Q2 | | 54,423,246 | ▲3.7 | |
| 2002 | Q1 | | 54,423,246 | ▲3.7 | |
| 2001 | Q4 | | 52,478,951 | ▲17.8 | |
| 2001 | Q3 | | 52,478,951 | ▲17.8 | |
| 2001 | Q2 | | 52,478,951 | ▲17.8 | |
| 2001 | Q1 | | 52,478,951 | ▲17.8 | |
| 2000 | Q4 | | 44,542,496 | ▲158.2 | |
| 2000 | Q3 | | 44,542,496 | ▲158.2 | |
| 2000 | Q2 | | 44,542,496 | ▲158.2 | |
| 2000 | Q1 | | 44,542,496 | ▲158.2 | |
| 1999 | Q4 | | 17,252,259 | | |
| 1999 | Q3 | | 17,252,259 | | |
| 1999 | Q2 | | 17,252,259 | | KJ14 Pasar Seni – KJ01 Gombak section opened on 1 June 1999 |
| 1999 | Q1 | | 17,252,259 | | |

== Gallery ==
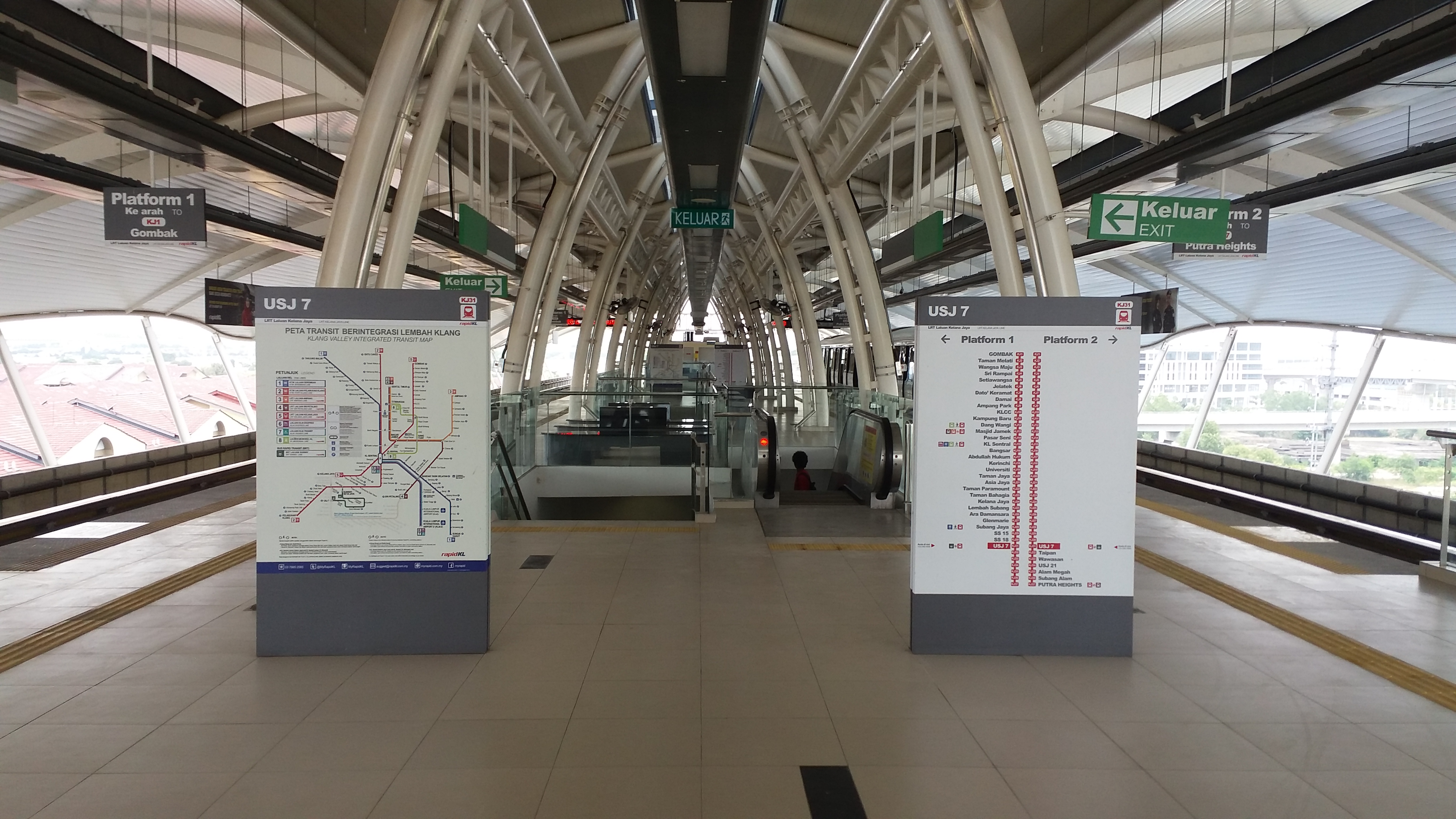
USJ 7
One of the stations on the recently opened extension of Kelana Jaya line in 2016

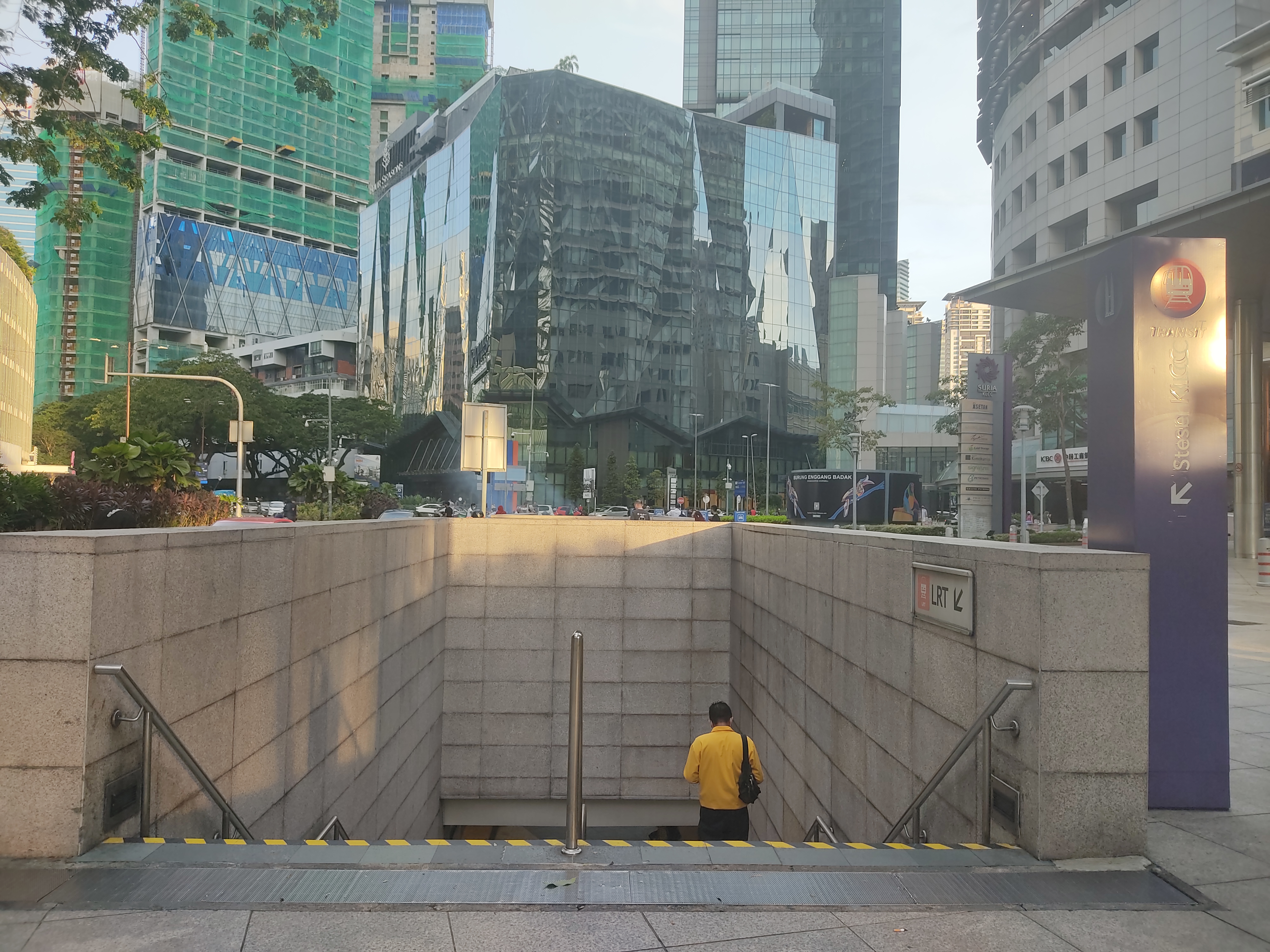
KLCC
The street entrance of the KLCC station

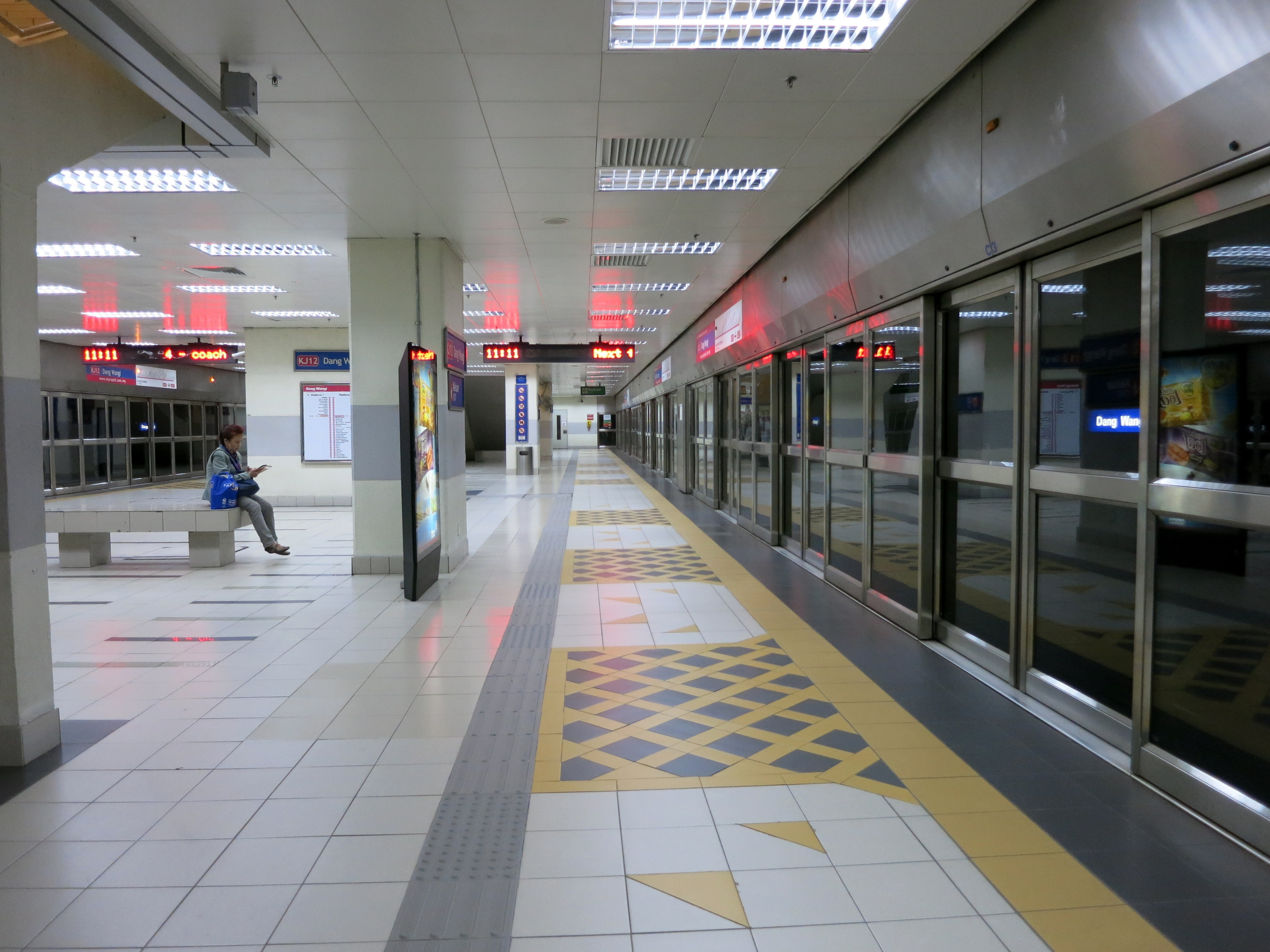
Dang Wangi
The platform of Dang Wangi station

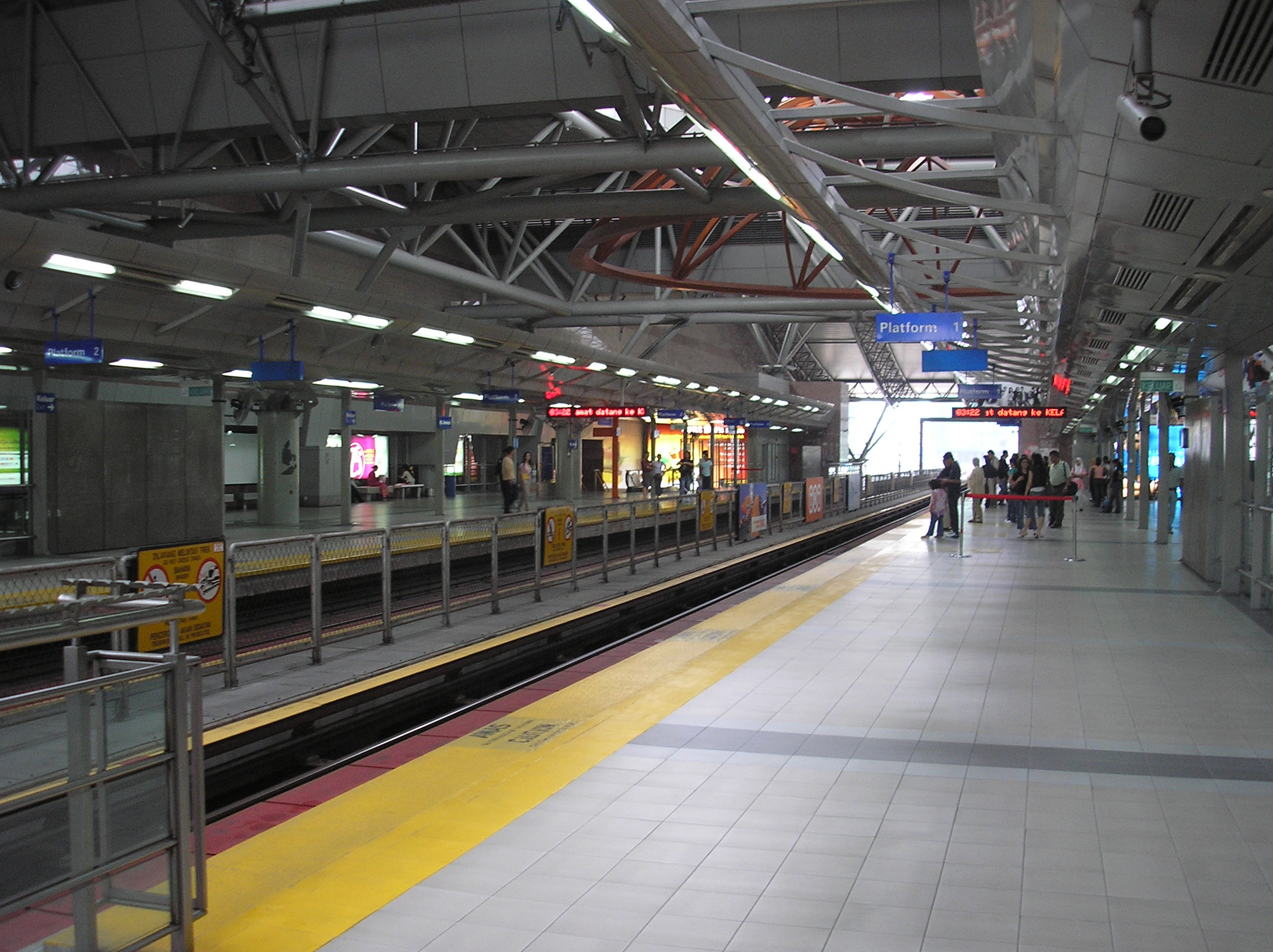
KL Sentral
The Kelana Jaya Line station in Kuala Lumpur Sentral

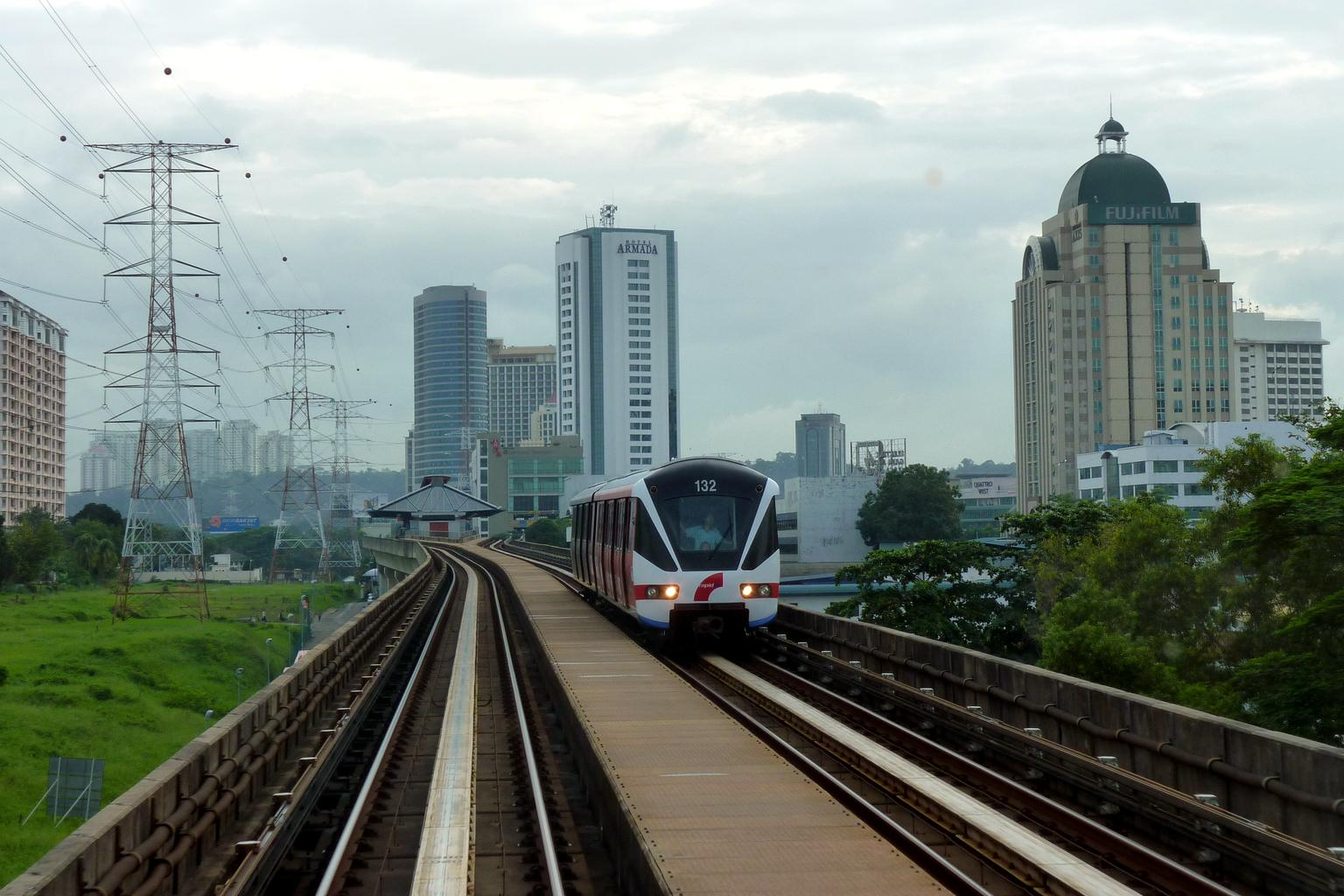
A train of the Kelana Jaya line passing through Asia Jaya

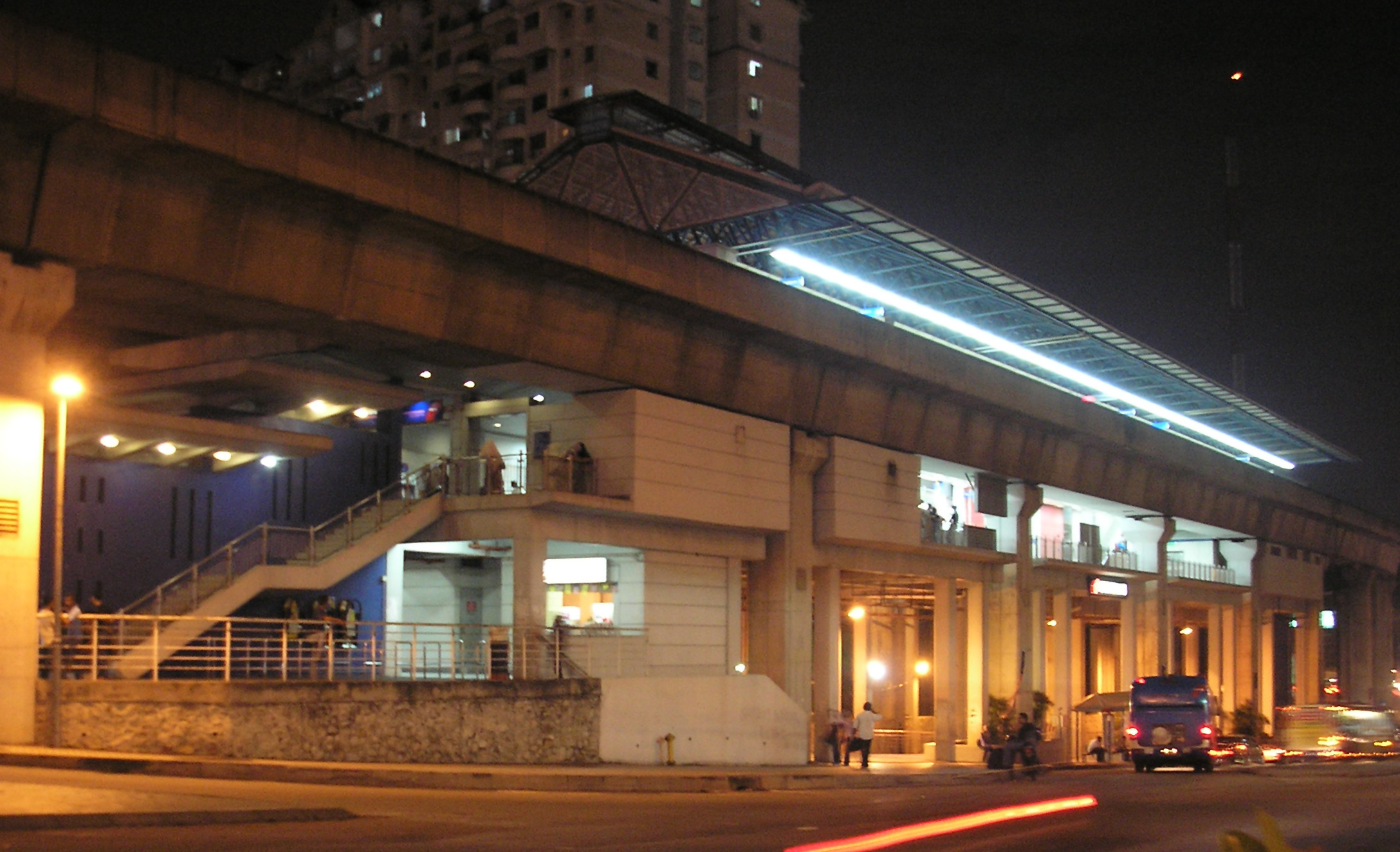
The Universiti station at night; one of the elevated stations in the system

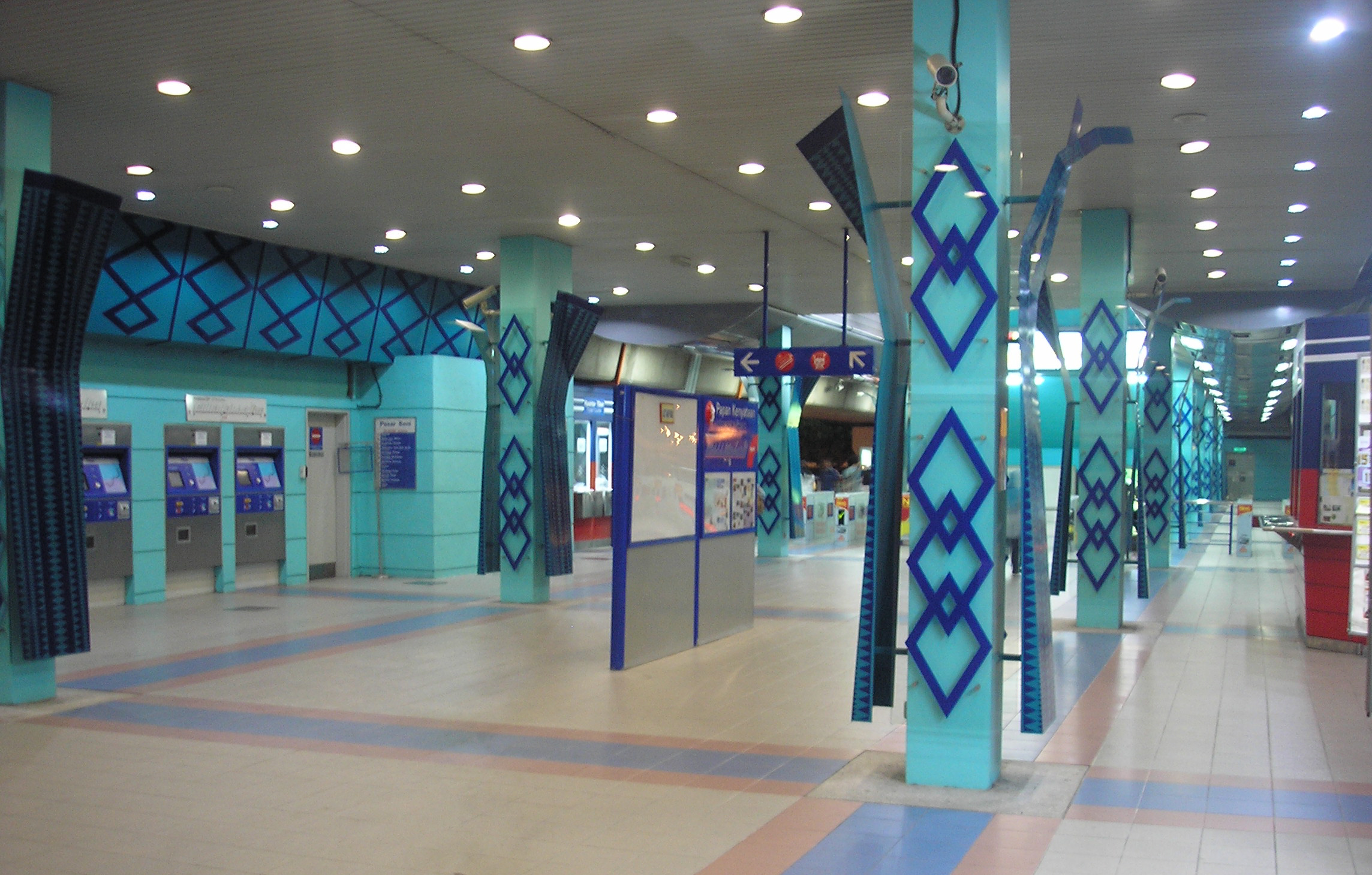
Pasar Seni
The concourse level of the KJ14 Pasar Seni

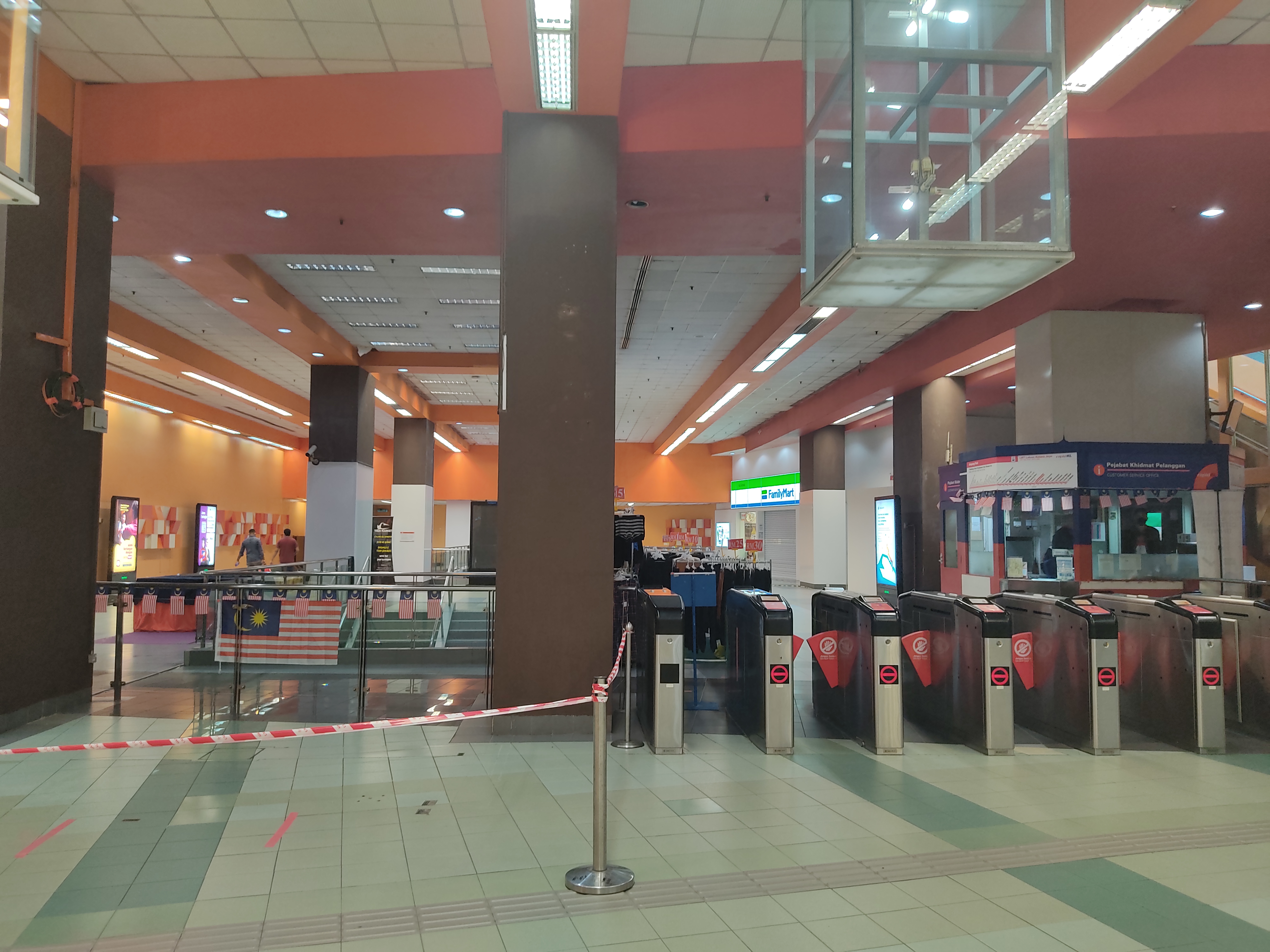
The concourse level of Ampang Park
