= Dang Wangi LRT station =

Railway station in Kuala Lumpur, Malaysia

KJ12 Dang Wangi
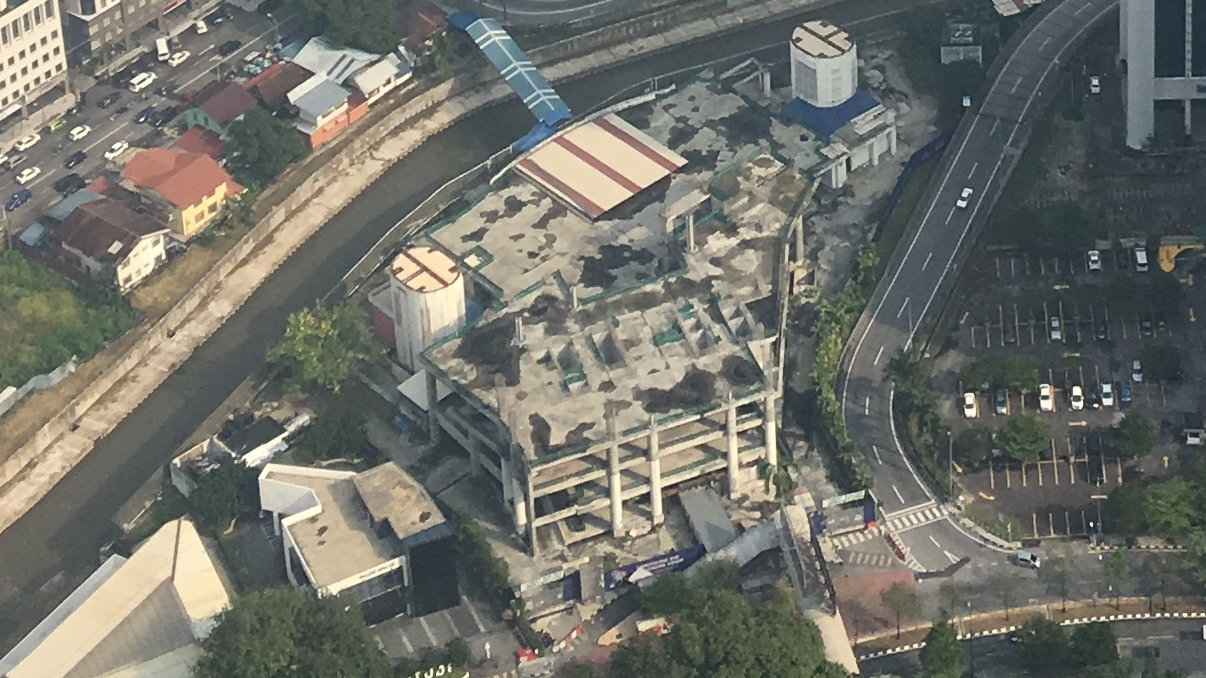
- The large surface structure of the Dang Wangi station. There is a TOD development on it.

General information
- Other names: Malay: دڠ واڠي (Jawi); Chinese: 金马律; Tamil: டாங் வாங்கி
- Location: Jalan Ampang, 50300 Kuala Lumpur; Malaysia
- Coordinates: 3°9′24″N 101°42′6″E
- System: Rapid KL
- Owner: Prasarana Malaysia
- Operator: Rapid Rail
- Line: 5 Kelana Jaya Line
- Platforms: 1 island platform
- Tracks: 2
- Connections: Connecting station to MR8 Bukit Nanas via a 300 meter canopied sidewalk

Construction
- Structure type: Underground
- Parking: Not available
- Cycle facilities: Not available
- Accessible: Available

Other information
- Station code: KJ12

History
- Opened: 1 June 1999; 27 years ago

Services
Preceding station		Following station
Kampung Baru towards Gombak	Kelana Jaya Line	Masjid Jamek towards Putra Heights
Location

Dang Wangi LRT station is an underground light rapid transit (LRT) station, in Kuala Lumpur, Malaysia, part of the LRT Kelana Jaya line. The station was opened on 1 June 1999, as part of the line's second extension, which includes the addition of 12 stations (not including Sri Rampai), and an underground line that the Dang Wangi station is connected to. The station is one of only five underground stations in the Kelana Jaya Line.

== Location ==
The station's access point is situated on the northeastern tip of central or old Kuala Lumpur along Jalan Ampang (Malay; English: Ampang Road), with Bukit Nanas (Pineapple Hill) directly across the road and the Klang River behind the station. The station's name, Dang Wangi, is derived from Jalan Dang Wangi (Dang Wangi Road), a road that intersects with Jalan Ampang 100 metres to the south of the station. The station is primarily intended to serve the northeastern region of central Kuala Lumpur, as well as several office buildings northwards along the road towards the Golden Triangle of Kuala Lumpur, the latter additionally provided with KL Monorail stations after 2003. Dang Wangi station are located close to the Capital Square mixed development.

== Interchange ==
The Dang Wangi station is located less than one kilometer west from the Bukit Nanas Monorail station on the KL Monorail line, also located beside Bukit Nanas. Despite the distance, official transit maps designate both stations as a connecting station between the Kelana Jaya Line and the KL Monorail. Accordingly, passengers who intend to switch to either lines must tap out and exit the paid areas of either station, walk along Jalan Ampang to reach either stations, and tap in or purchase a new ticket. No proper shelters were initially provided for the route between the stations; in the mid-2000s, canopies along sidewalks were erected between the stations. An overhead footbridge directly in front of Dang Wangi station, which crosses Jalan Ampang and includes escalators, was also constructed around the time.

Alternately, the Medan Tuanku Monorail station is also accessible from the back exit of Dang Wangi station, via a pedestrian bridge across the Klang River and then a short walk along Jalan Raja Abdullah and Jalan Sultan Ismail. This however, is not designated as a connection on official transit maps.

== Layout and design ==
The Dang Wangi station, like all other underground Kelana Jaya Line stations, is of basic construction consisting of only three levels: the entrance at the street level, and the concourse and platform levels underground. All levels are linked via escalators and stairways, while elevators are additionally provided between the concourse level and the platform level. The station contains only one island platform for two tracks of opposite directions, with floor-to-ceiling platform screen doors separating the platforms from the tracks.

The station councourse has only one entry and exit point from street level, adjoining a massive low-rise structure behind the vestibule.

G	Street Level	Jalan Ampang, Pedestrian walkway towards Bukit Nanas monorail station
C	Concourse	Faregates, Ticketing Machines, Station Control
P	Platform 1:	5 Kelana Jaya Line towards KJ1 Gombak (→)
P	Island platform, Doors will open on the right
P	Platform 2:	5 Kelana Jaya Line towards KJ37 Putra Heights (←)

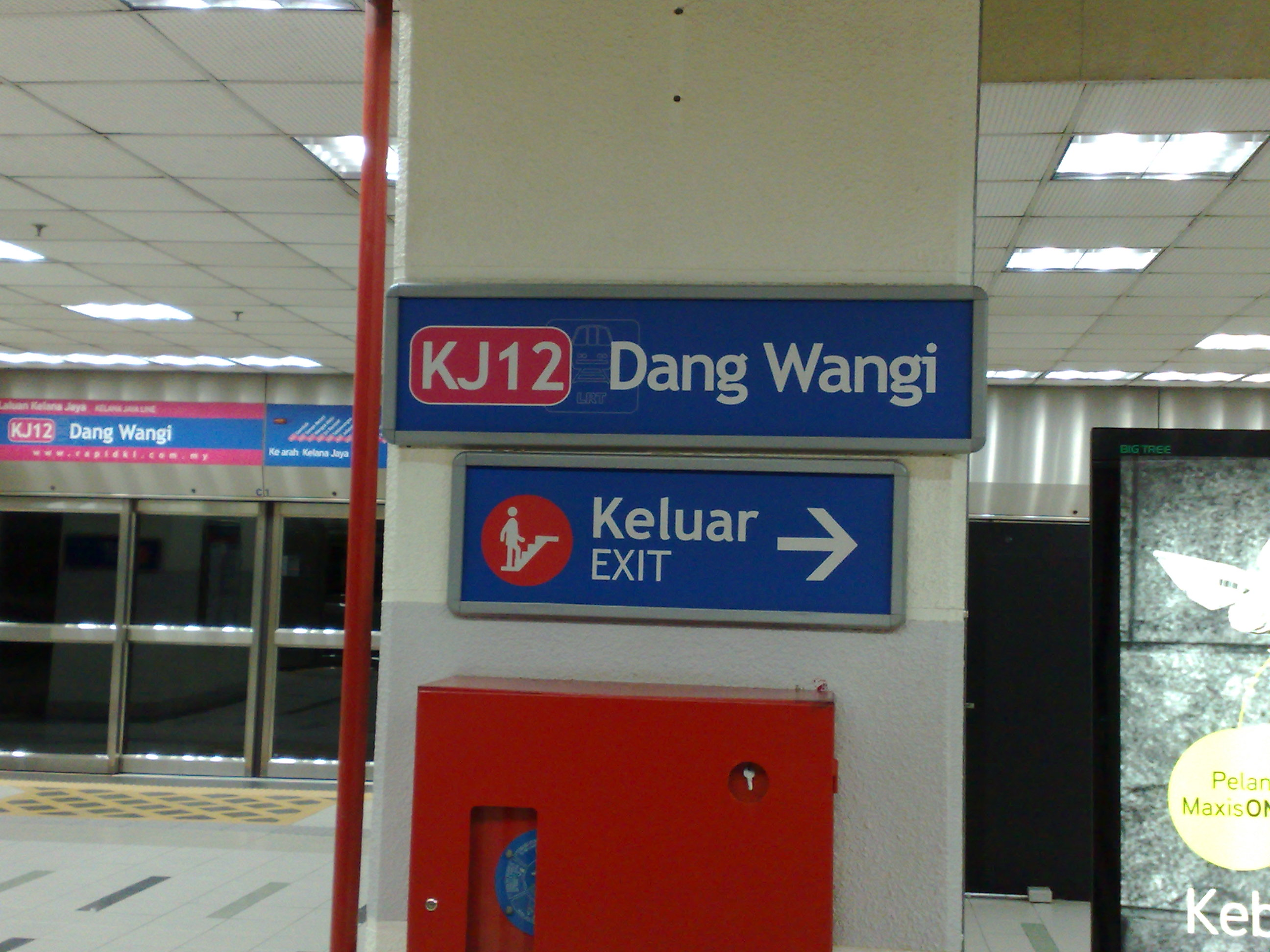
Station's platform board

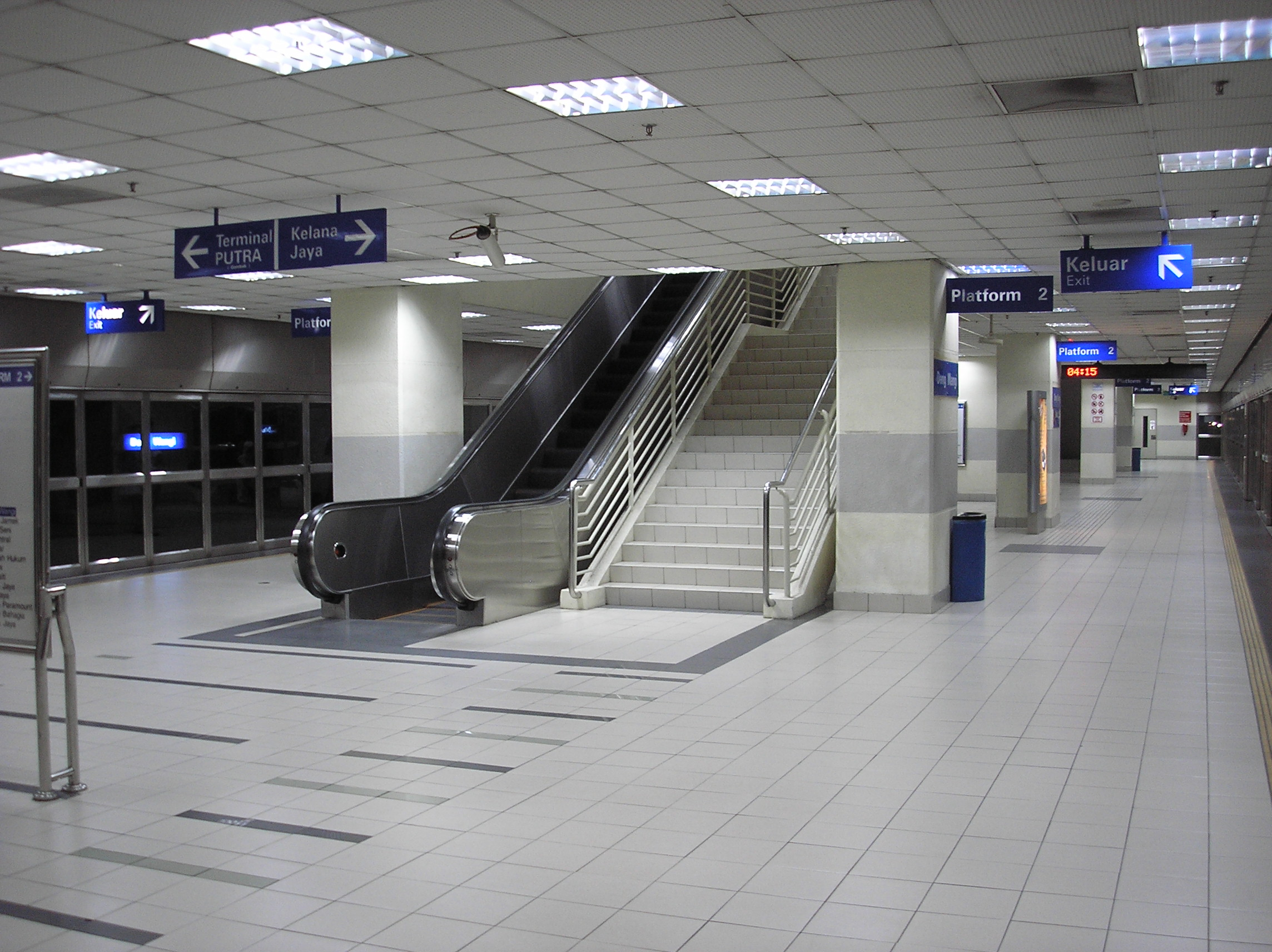
View of the platform level of Dang Wangi station

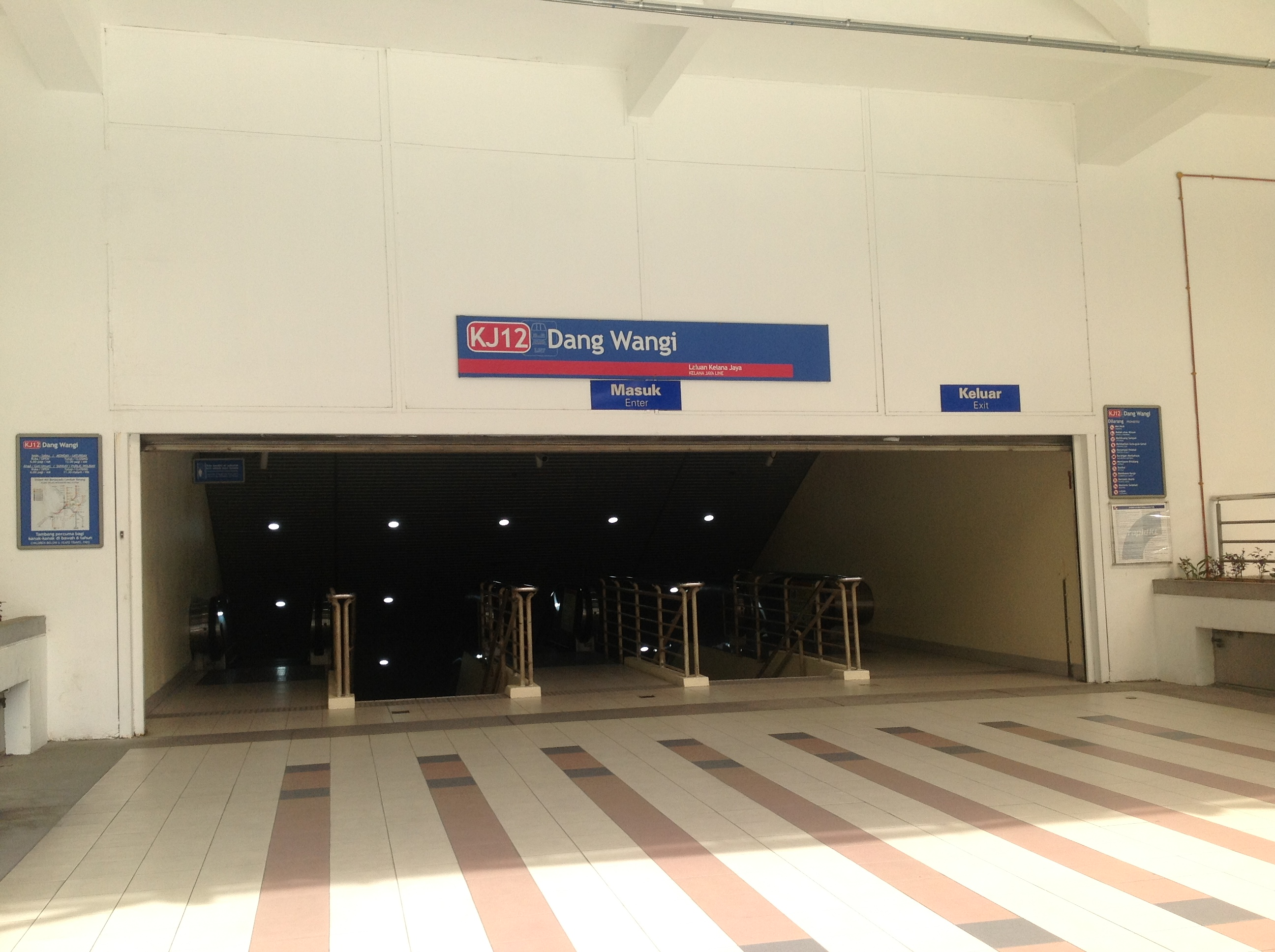
Station concourse entrance

== See also ==
- Rail transport in Malaysia
