= Saloma Link =

Pedestrian and bicyclist footbridge in Kuala Lumpur, Malaysia

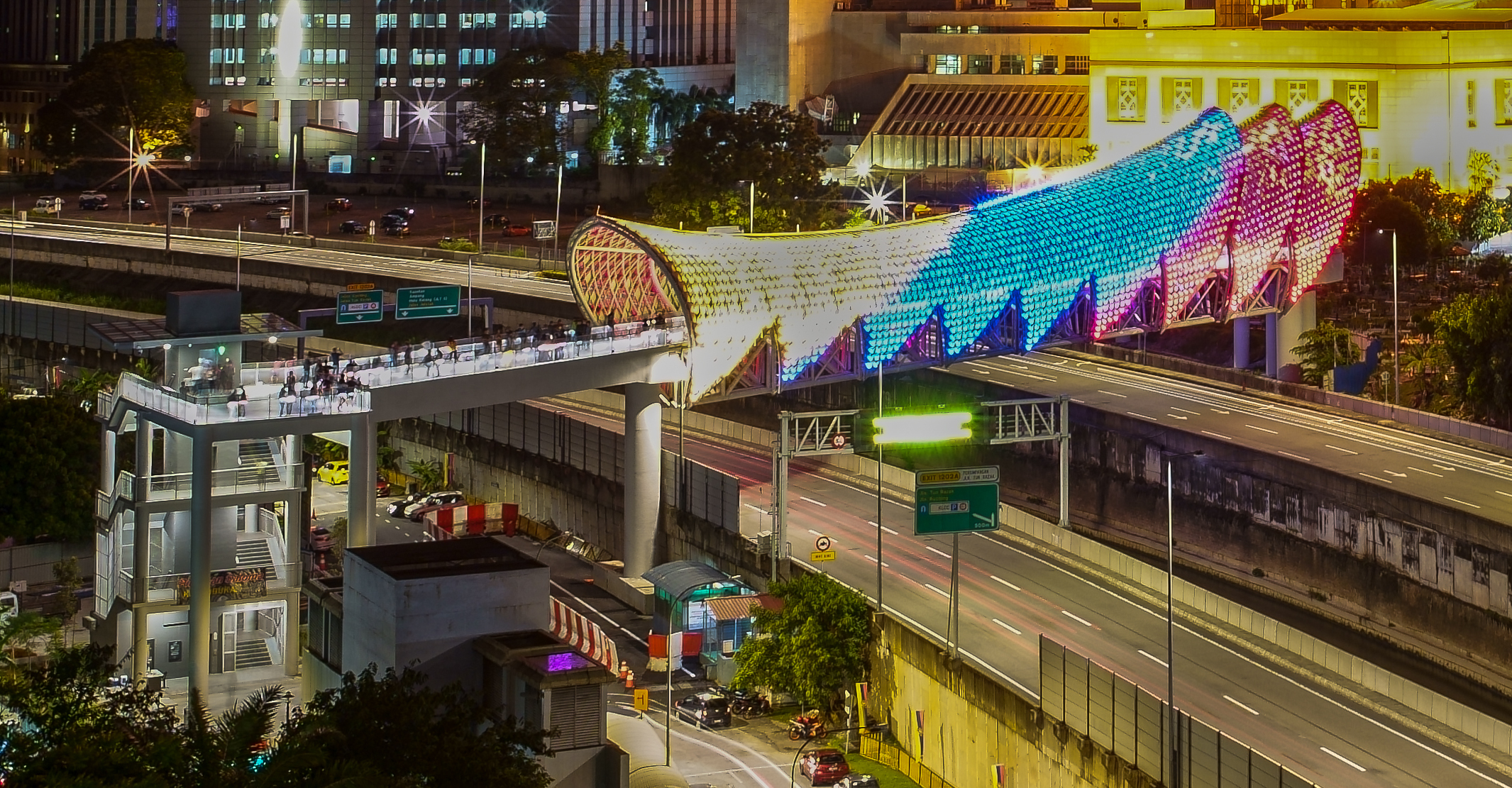
- Saloma Link at night
- Coordinates: 3°09′40″N 101°42′29″E
- Carries: Pedestrian and bicycle traffic
- Crosses: Ampang–Kuala Lumpur Elevated Highway and Klang River
- Locale: Kampung Baru, Kuala Lumpur
- Official name: Saloma Link Bridge

Characteristics
- Total length: 69 metres (226 ft)
- Width: 3 metres (9.8 ft)
- Clearance below: 7 metres (23 ft)

History
- Designer: VERITAS Design Group
- Opened: 5 February 2020; 5 years ago

Location
- Interactive map of Saloma Link

Saloma Link (Malay: Pintasan Saloma) is a 69 metres (226 ft) combined pedestrian and bicyclist bridge across the Klang River in Kuala Lumpur.

Directed northwest to southeast it joins the districts of Kampung Baru (northwest) and Kuala Lumpur City Centre (southeast). On the southwestern end a ramp leads up to the bridge, whereas on the northwest there are stairs and an elevator from street level. The bridge’s architecture is inspired by the sireh junjung (betel nut leaf arrangement) concept, which is an integral part of a Malay wedding. At night, the bridge cannot be accessed (from 01:00 until 05:00 from Monday to Saturday and 0:30 until 05:00 on Sundays and public holidays). The bridge is named after the Malaysian-Singaporean singer Saloma, who is buried at the nearby Jalan Ampang Muslim Cemetery.

VERITAS Design Group designed the structure, which opened to the public on 5 February 2020. The project cost 31 million Ringgit Malaysia ($7.5 million).

== Gallery ==
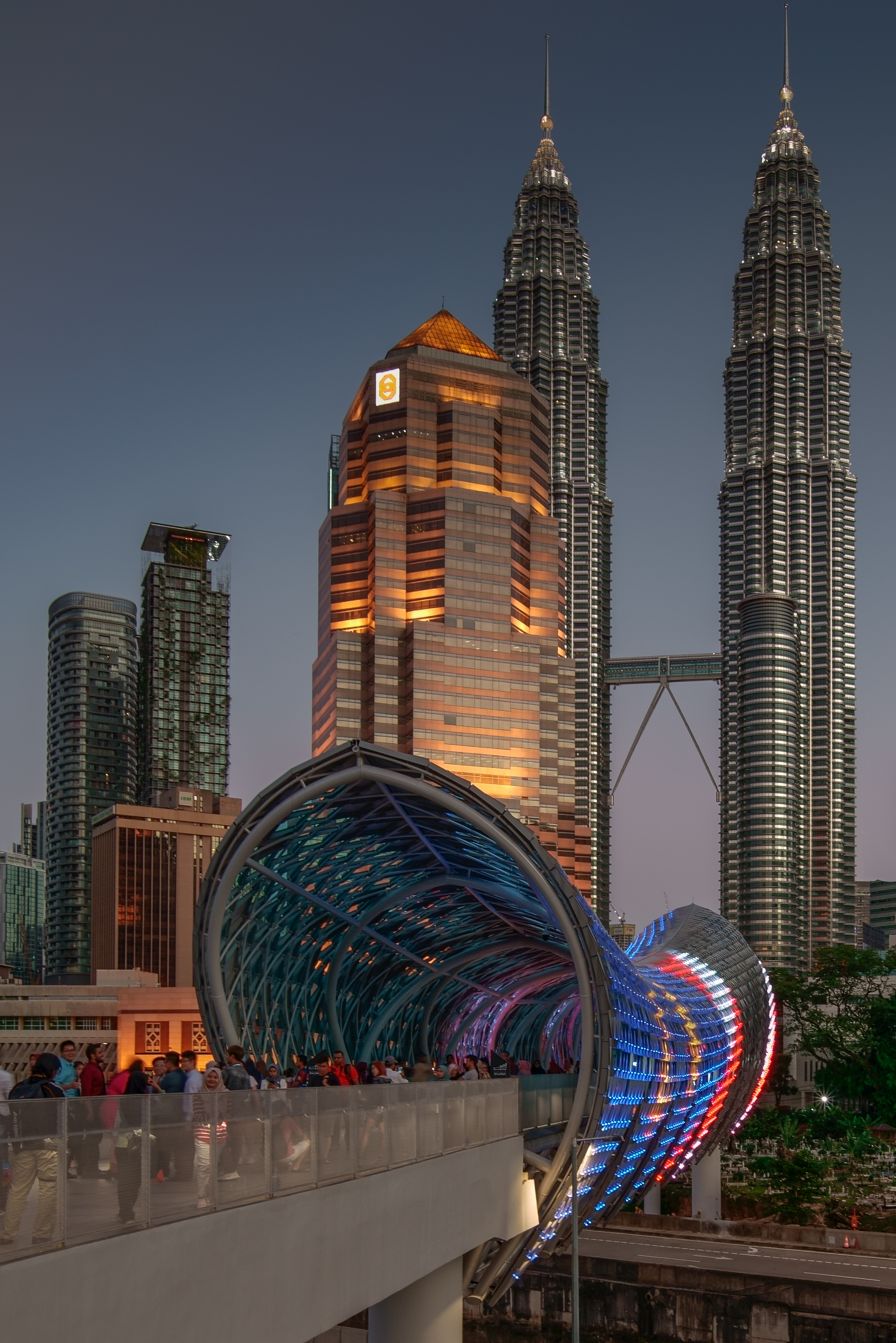
At dusk

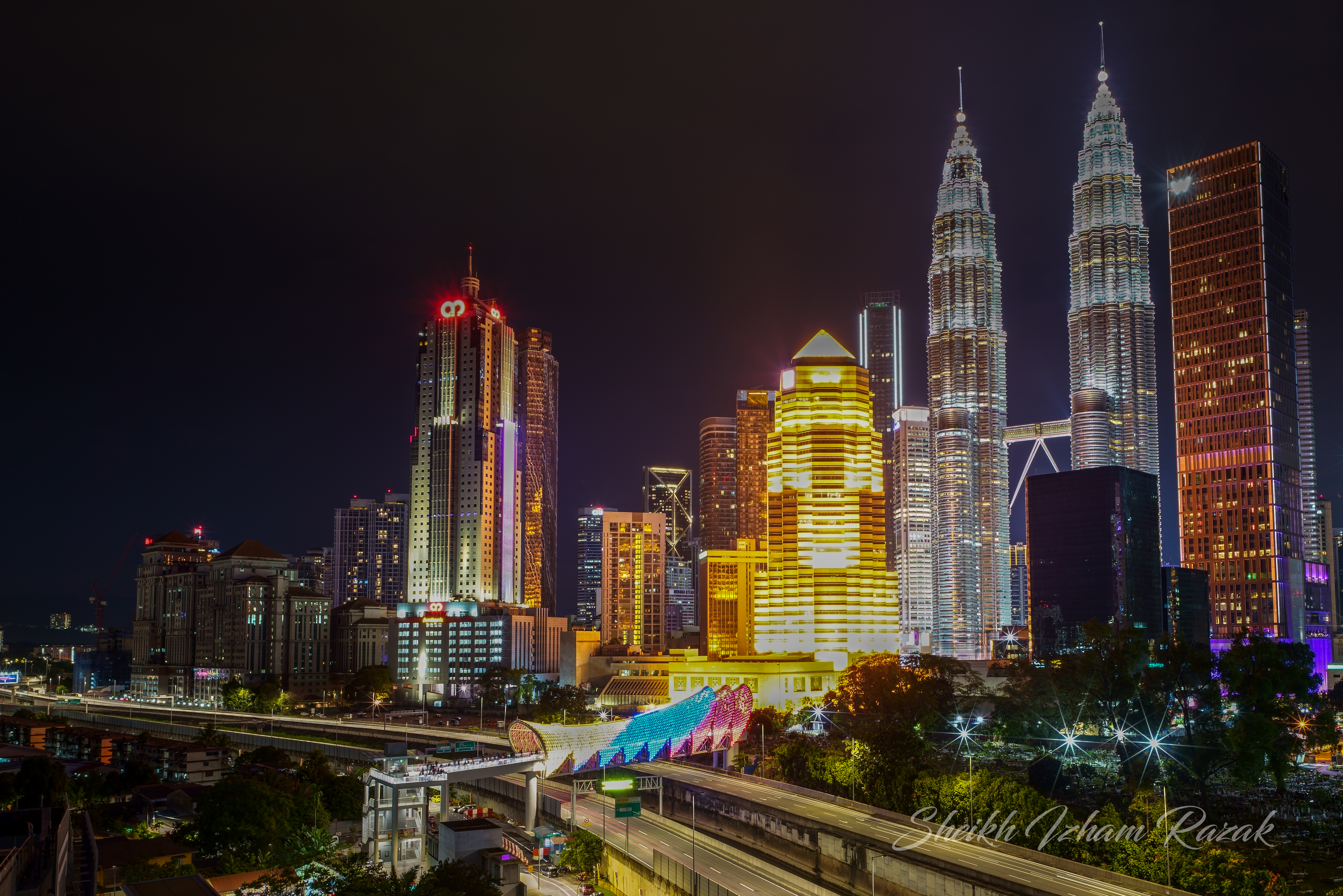
At night

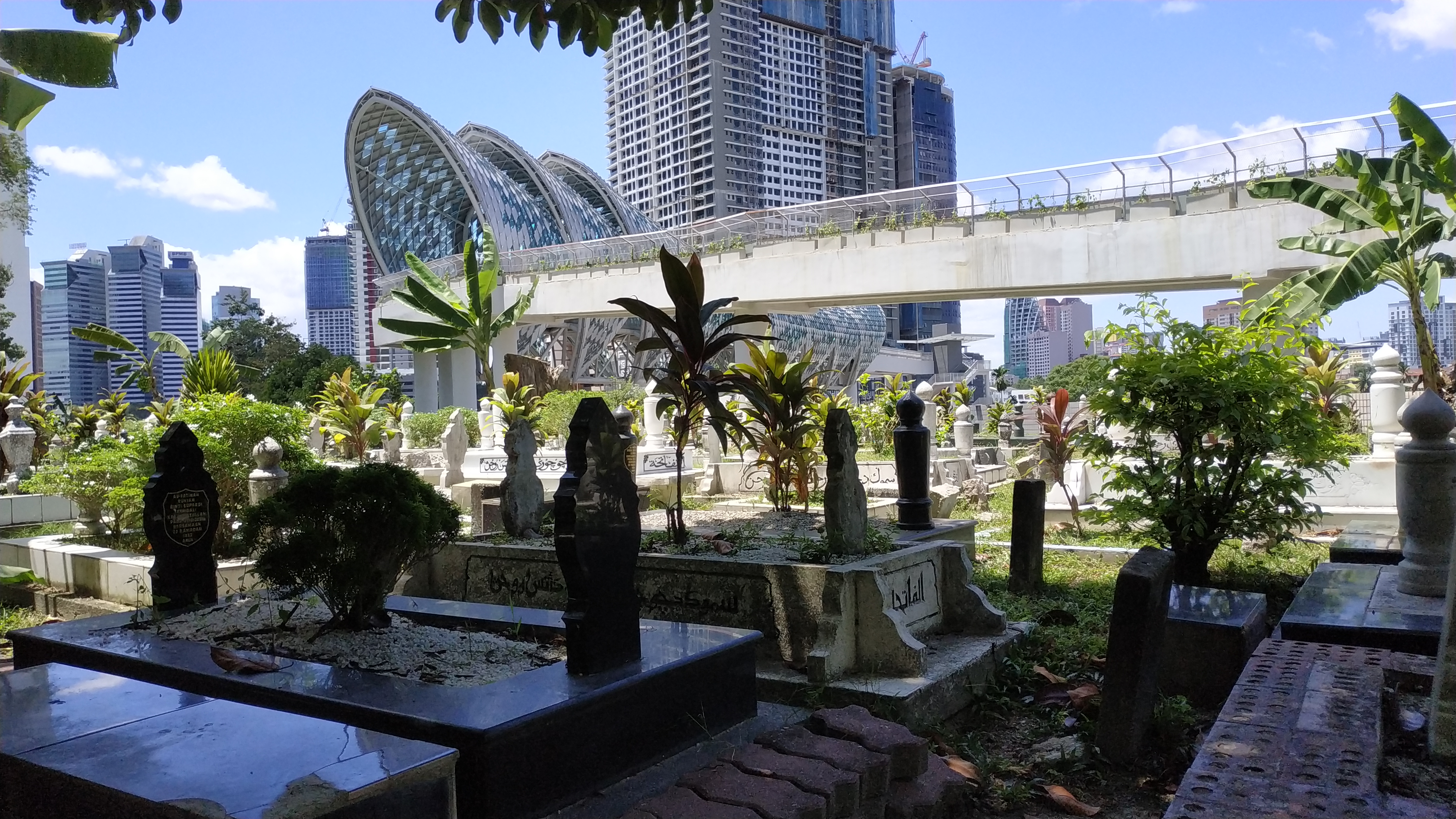
As seen from Jalan Ampang Muslim cemetery

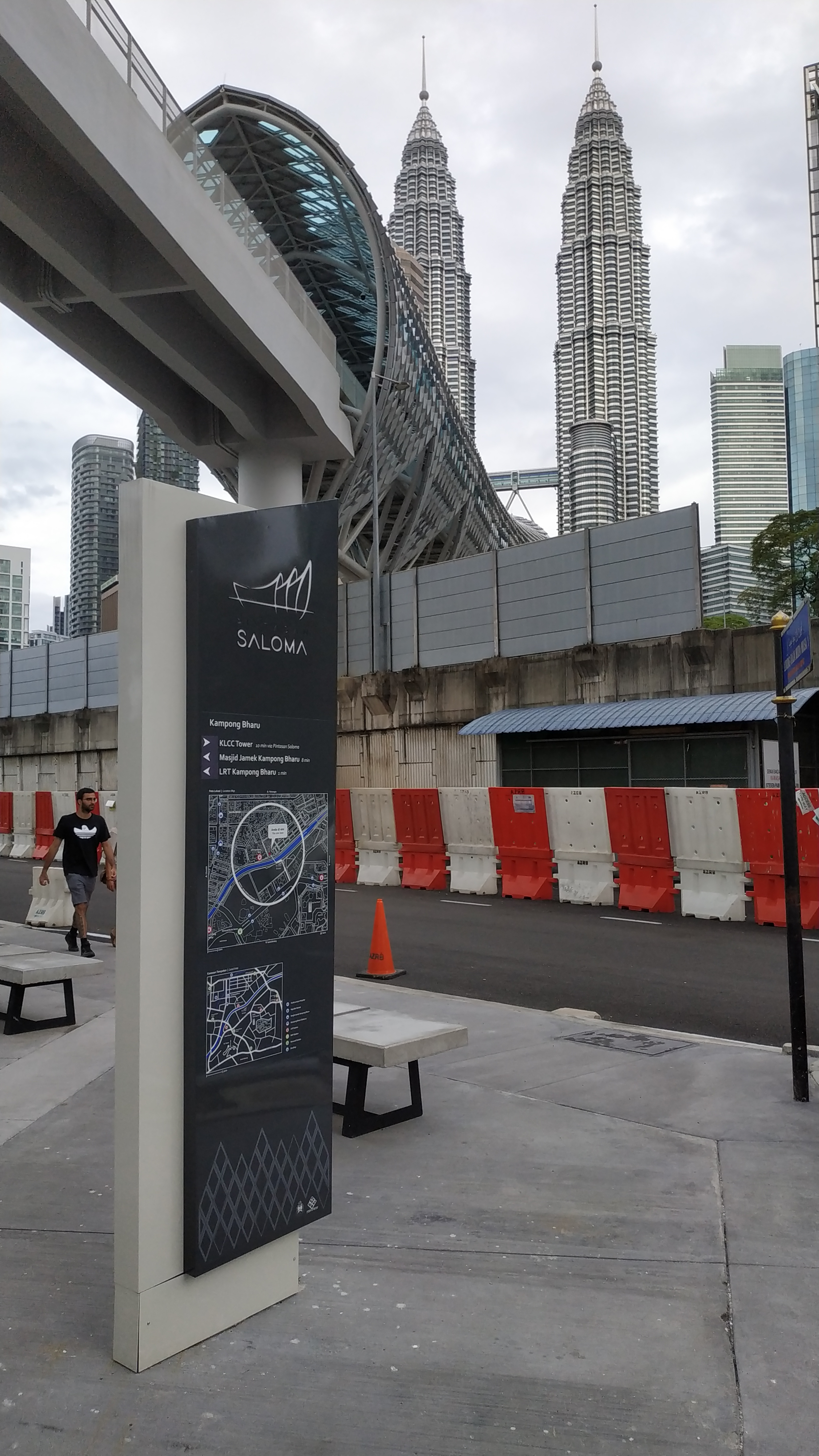
As seen from Kampung Baru side

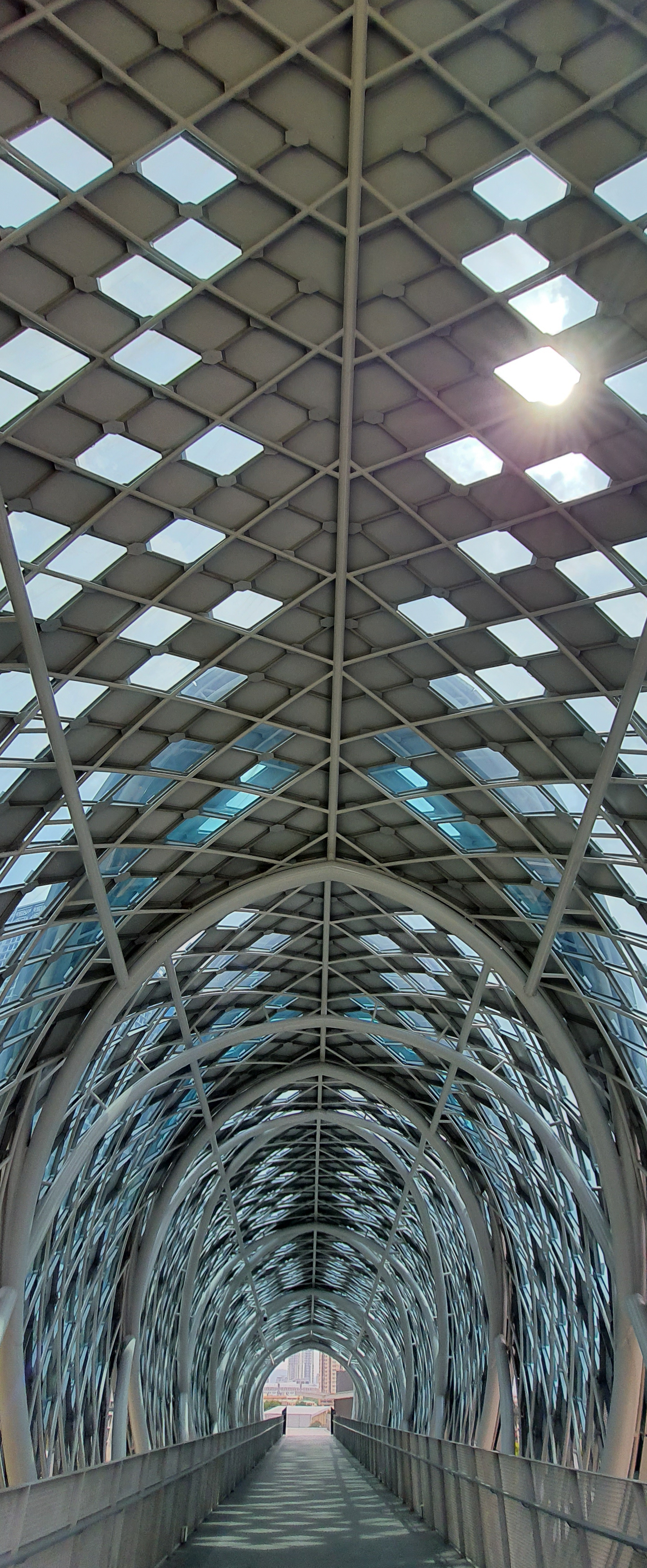
An interior shot of the Saloma Link footbridge in Kuala Lumpur, showing the complex steel lattice structure interspersed with cladding and glass panels.

== See also ==
- Elmina Rainbow Bridge
