= Architecture of Kuala Lumpur =

The architecture of Kuala Lumpur is a blend of old colonial influences, Asian traditions, Malay Islamic inspirations, modern and post modern mix. Being a relatively young city, most of Kuala Lumpur's colonial buildings were built toward the end of 19th and early 20th century. These buildings have Mughal, Tudor, Neo-Gothic or Grecian-Spanish style or architecture. Most of the styling have been modified to cater to use local resources and the acclimatized to the local climate, which is hot and humid all year around.

Independence coupled with the rapid economic growth from the 70's to the 90's, saw buildings with more local and Islamic motifs arise in the central districts of the city. Many of these buildings derive their design from traditional Malay items, such as the head dress and the keris. Some of these buildings have Islamic geometric motifs integrated with the designs of the building, such as square patterns or a dome.

Late Modernist and Post Modernist style architecture began to appear in the late 1990s and early 2000s. Buildings with all-glass exteriors sprang up around the city, with the most prominent example being the Petronas Twin Towers As an emerging global city in a newly industrialized economy, the city skyline is expected to experience further changes in decades to come with construction works like The Gardens, The Pavilion, Four Seasons Place, Lot C of KLCC and many more.

== Neo Moorish and Mughal ==
Buildings with Neo-Moorish and Mughal style of architecture were built at the turn of the 20th century by the colonial power, Great Britain. While most of the buildings with such architecture are in Dataran Merdeka, there are some in older part of town such as the Jamek Mosque on Jalan Tun Perak, and the KTM railway station and the KTM Administration Office. Famous buildings in the neo-Moorish style includes Sultan Abdul Samad Building, the Court of Appeals and the old Kuala Lumpur High Court. All the buildings mention before are within the Dataran Merdeka area. Other buildings with Moorish architecture are Bandaraya Theatre, InfoKraft (National Textile Museum), Kuala Lumpur Memorial Library, National History Museum and the old Sessions and Magistrates Courts before it was moved to Jalan Duta. The architect responsible for many of these buildings was Arthur Benison Hubback who designed the Jamek Mosque, the Railway Station, KTM Administration Office, Bandaraya Theatre and the textile museum, as well as contributing to the design of Sultan Abdul Samad Building.

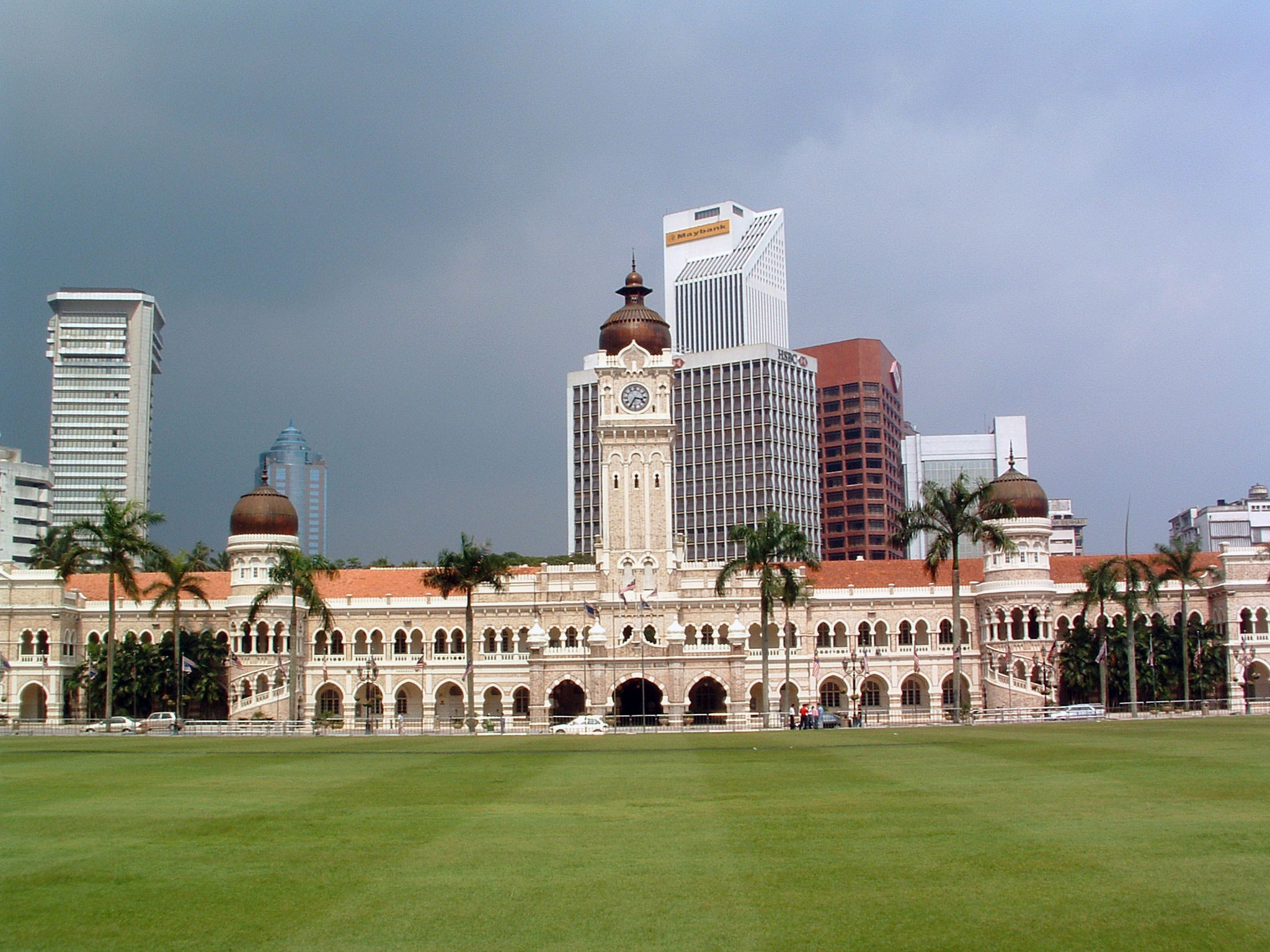
Sultan Abdul Samad Building

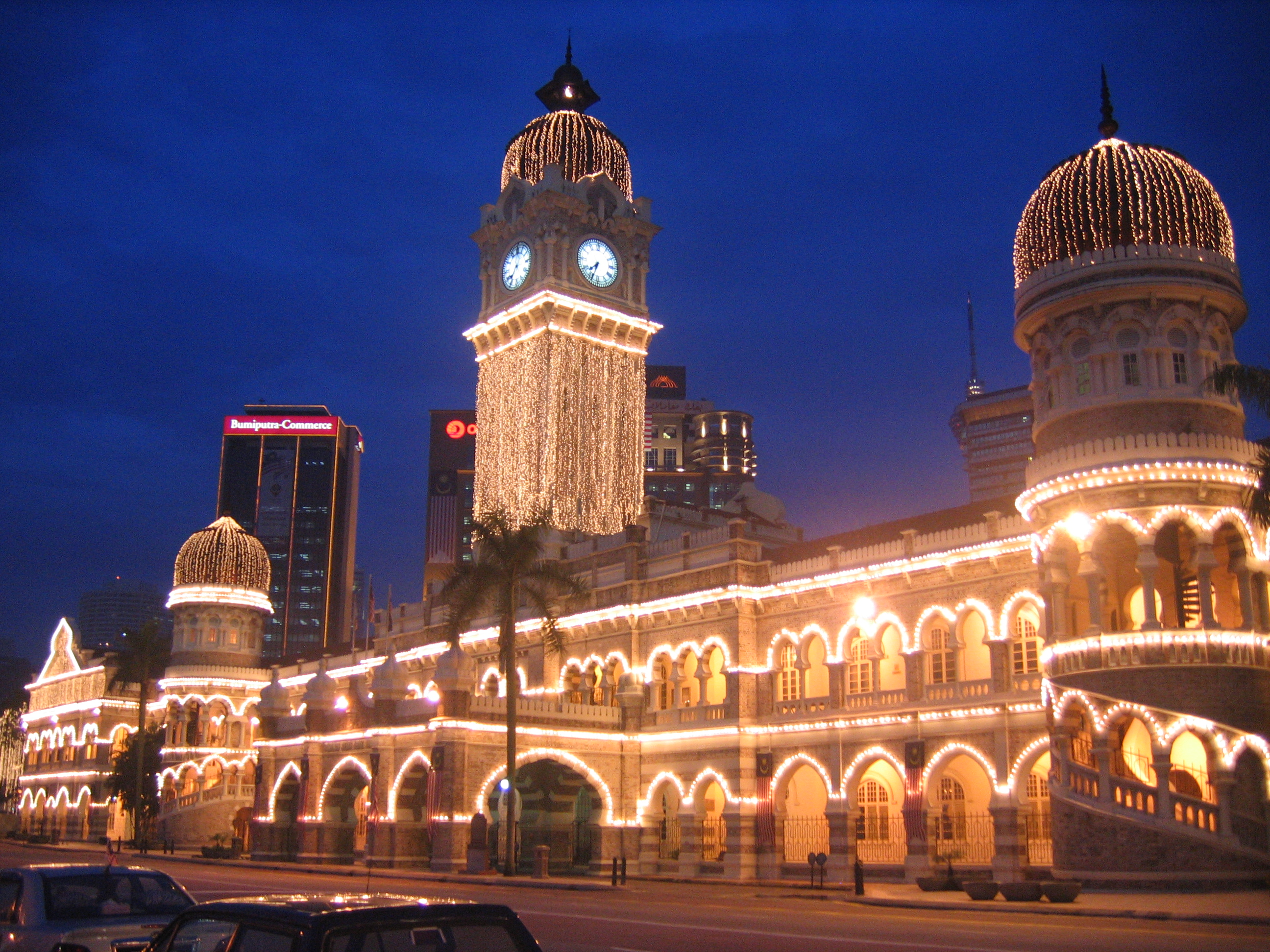
Night view of Sultan Abdul Samad Building

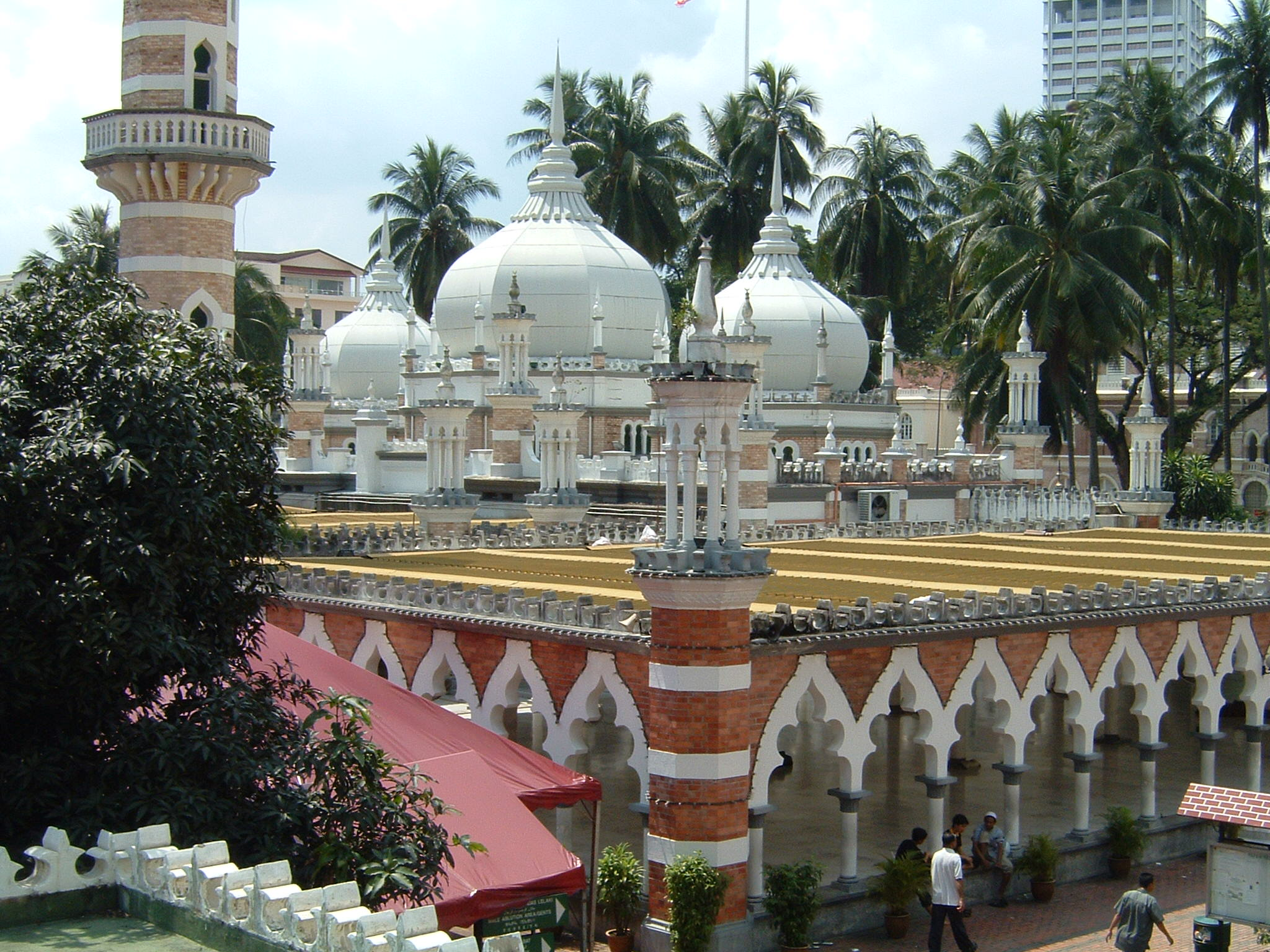
Jamek Mosque

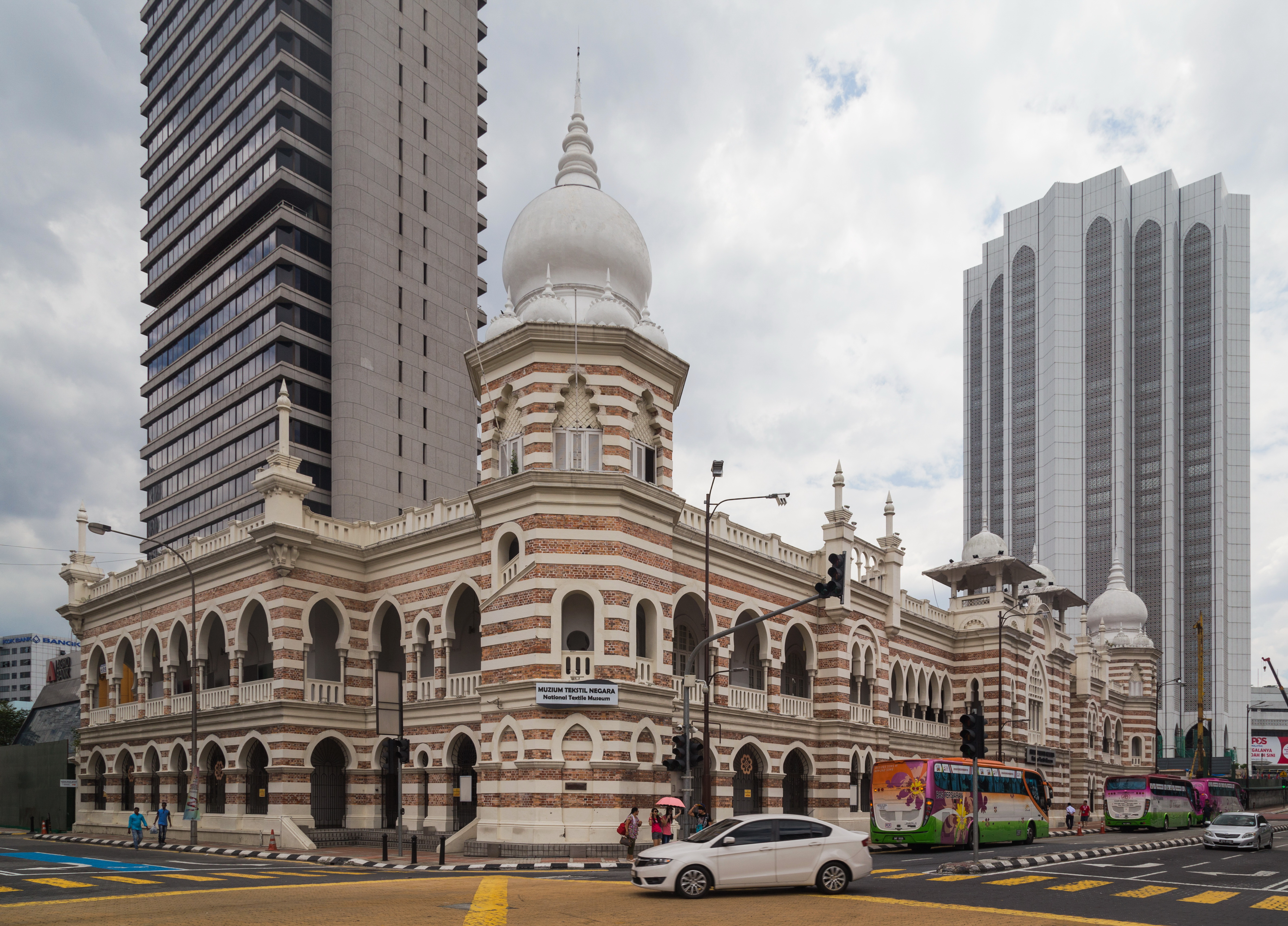
Former FMS Railway headquarters

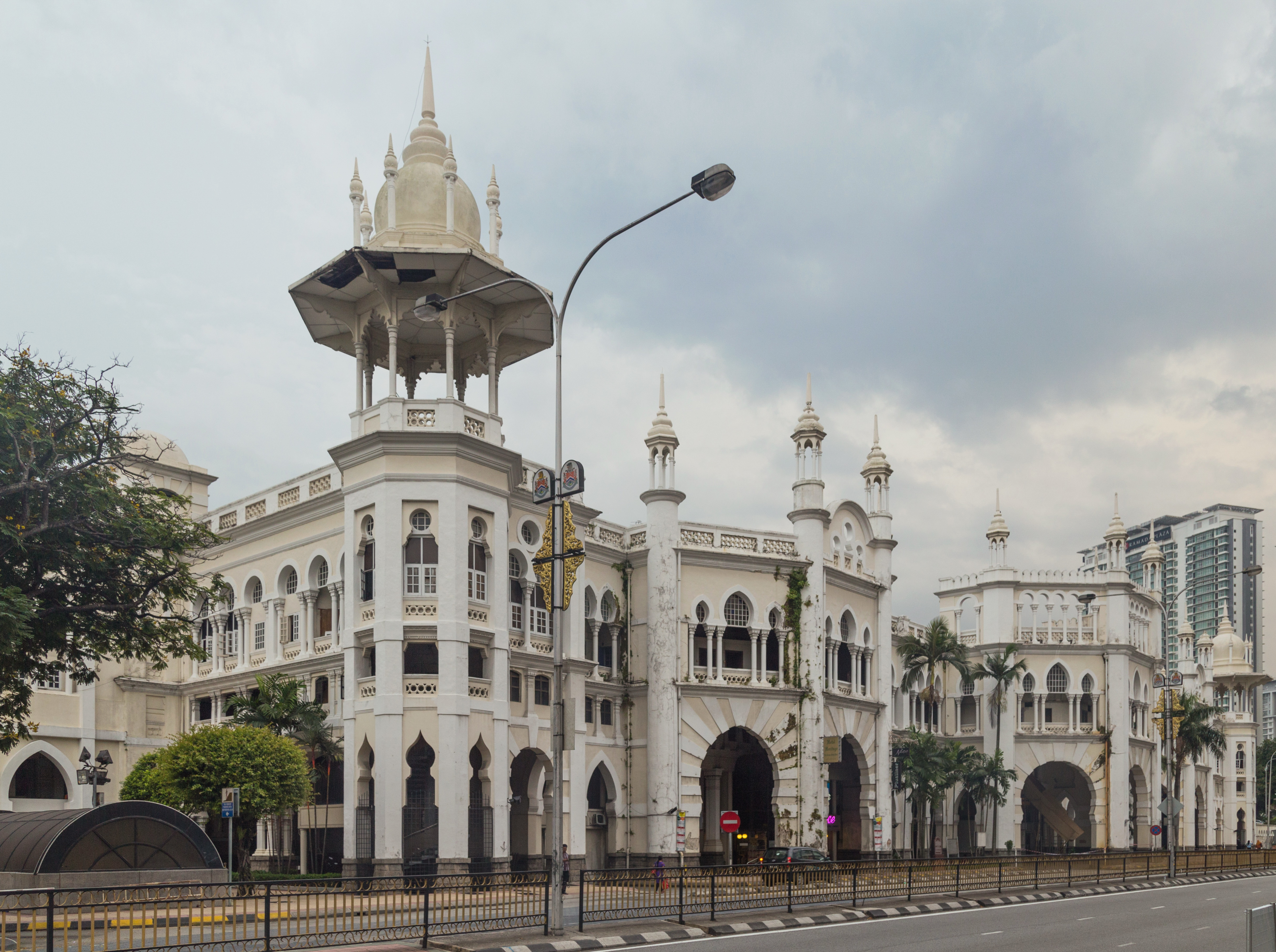
Kuala Lumpur Railway Station

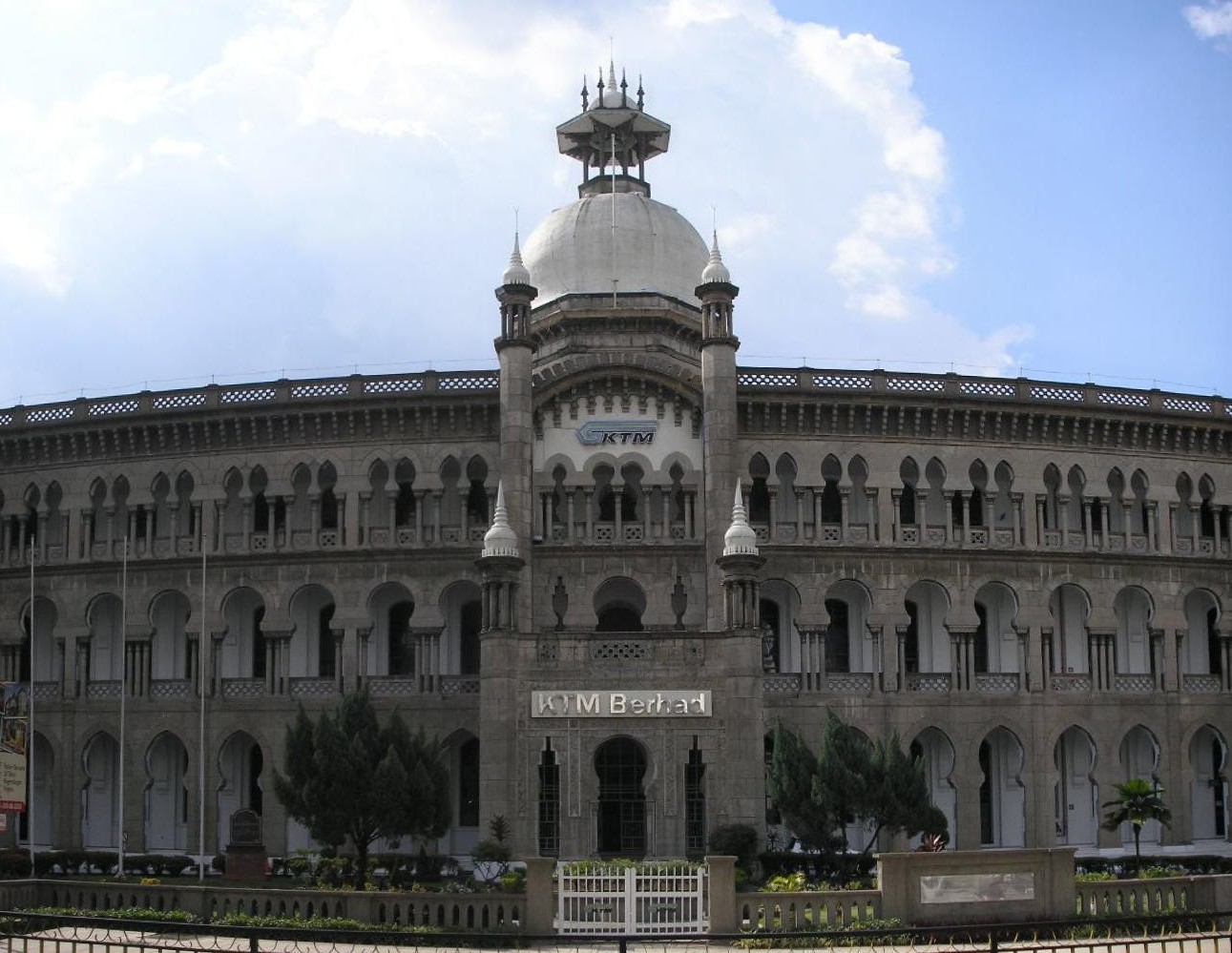
KTM Headquarters

== Tudorbethan, Victorian and Art Deco ==
There are many buildings built by the British at the turn of the 20th century that exhibit Victorian and Tudor influence in their designs. The buildings are modified to be suitable to the tropical environment of Malaysia, which is hot and humid with many days of monsoon rain.

Mock Tudor or Tudorbethan styled architecture is the feature of two sporting clubs situated in Dataran Merdeka, the Royal Selangor Club and the Selangor Chinese Club. The buildings were built in 1910 and 1929 respectively. The architectural style, which features large exposed wooden beams in half-timbered walls, was the typical model for some of the earliest social club buildings in the country.

Neo-Gothic architecture exists in religious building built by the colonial powers such as the St. Mary's Cathedral, St Andrew's Presbyterian Church, Church of the Holy Rosary and St. John's Church which is converted into Bukit Nanas Community Center. However, some residences such as Carcosa Seri Negara, which was built in 1897 for Frank Swettenham also feature this style of architecture.

Victorian architecture was a popular design choice during the British colonial administration to build schools, such as the Old Victoria Institution, Methodist Boys' School and Convent Bukit Nanas. Other examples of building in this style of architecture include National Art Gallery, Malaysia Tourism Center, Industrial Court Building, PAM Center (housing the Malaysian Institute of Architects).

Art Deco style was popular from the 1920s up until the 1930s, dominating the Kuala Lumpur cityscape of the time, with buildings still existing till this day such as such as Victoria Institution, Central Market, Coliseum Theatre and the Oriental building which was the tallest building in Malaysia at its time. These buildings are built when Art Deco was still flourishing in the rest of the world during the era of the Golden 20s, and keeps going until the 1930s, with other buildings such as the Odeon theater, Lee Rubber Building, Wisma Ekran and also Rubber Research Institute Building being built.

St. Mary's Cathedral, Kuala Lumpur

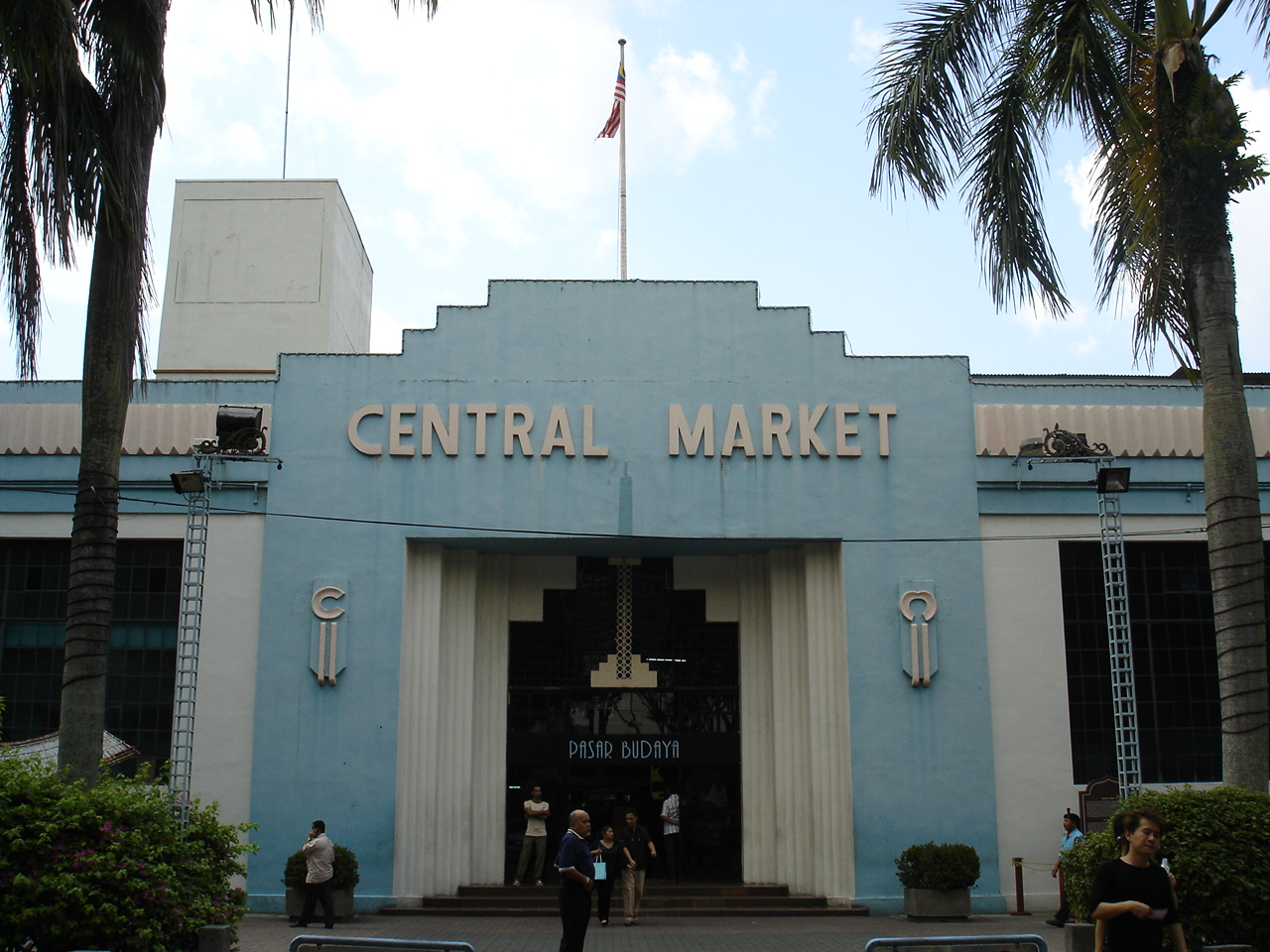
Central Market

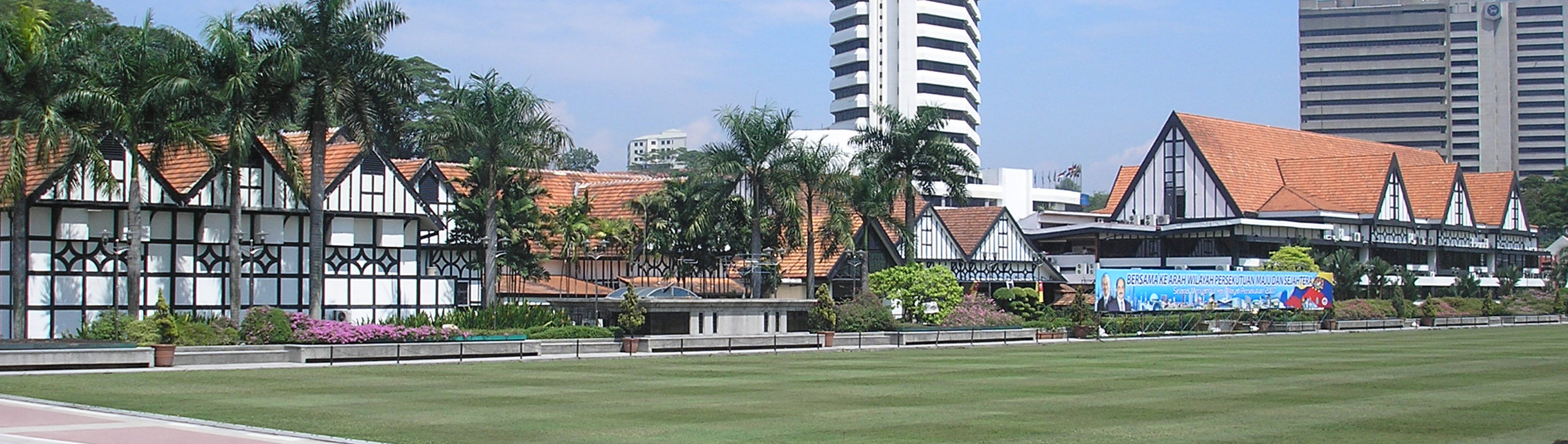
Royal Selangor Club

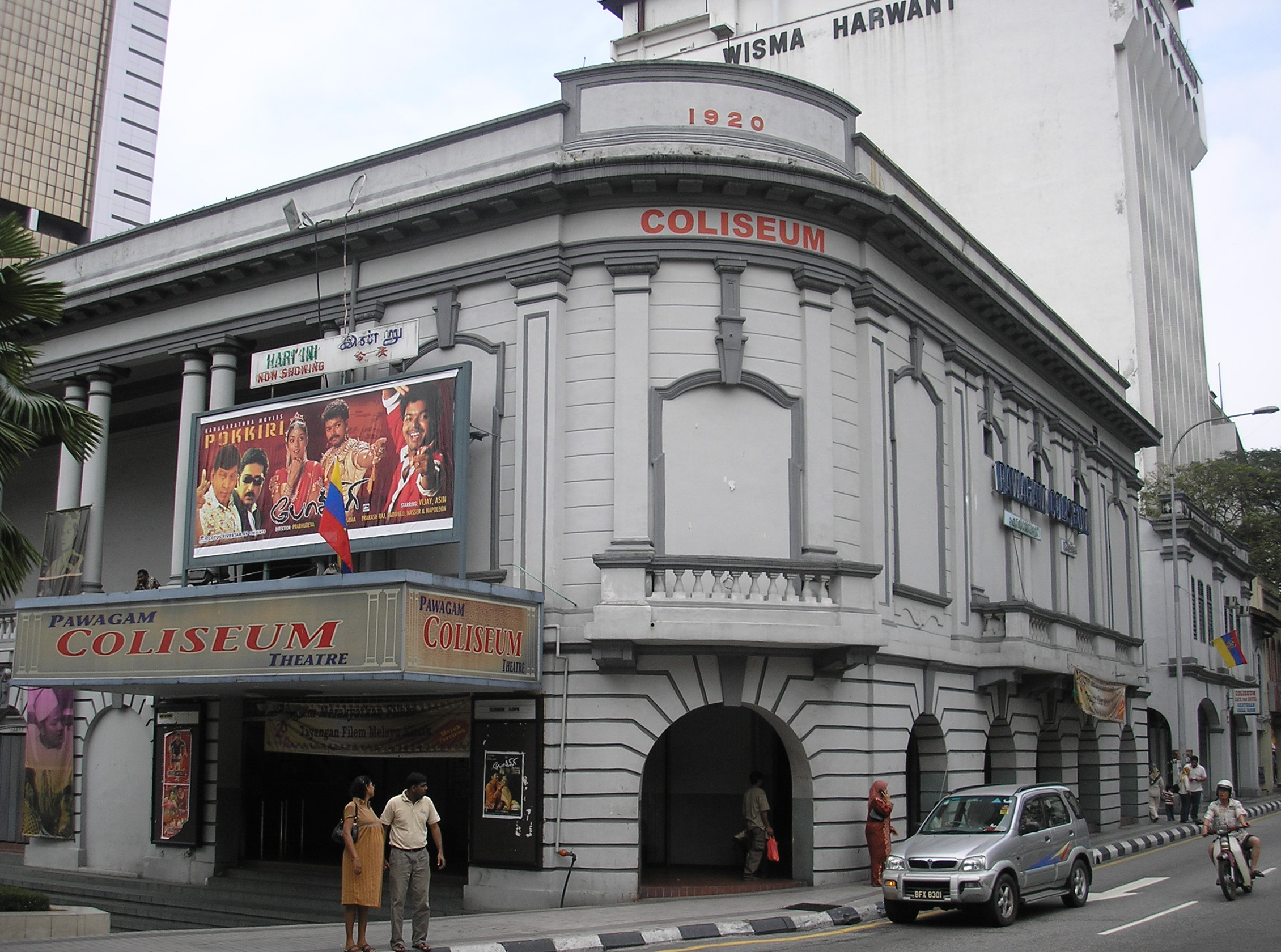
Coliseum Theater

== Straits Chinese ==
Prior to the Second World War, many shophouses, usually two story with functional shops on the ground floor and separate residential spaces upstairs, were built around the old city center. These shop-houses drew inspiration from Straits Chinese and European traditions. Some of these shop-houses have made way for new developments but there are still many standing today around Medan Pasar (Old Market Square), Chinatown, Jalan Tuanku Abdul Rahman, Jalan Doraisamy, Bukit Bintang and Tengkat Tong Shin areas. St. John's Institution in Bukit Nanas is famous of its imposing white and red brick building with emphasis on Grecian-Spanish style of architecture. The Telecom Museum, which was built in 1928 also sports the influence.

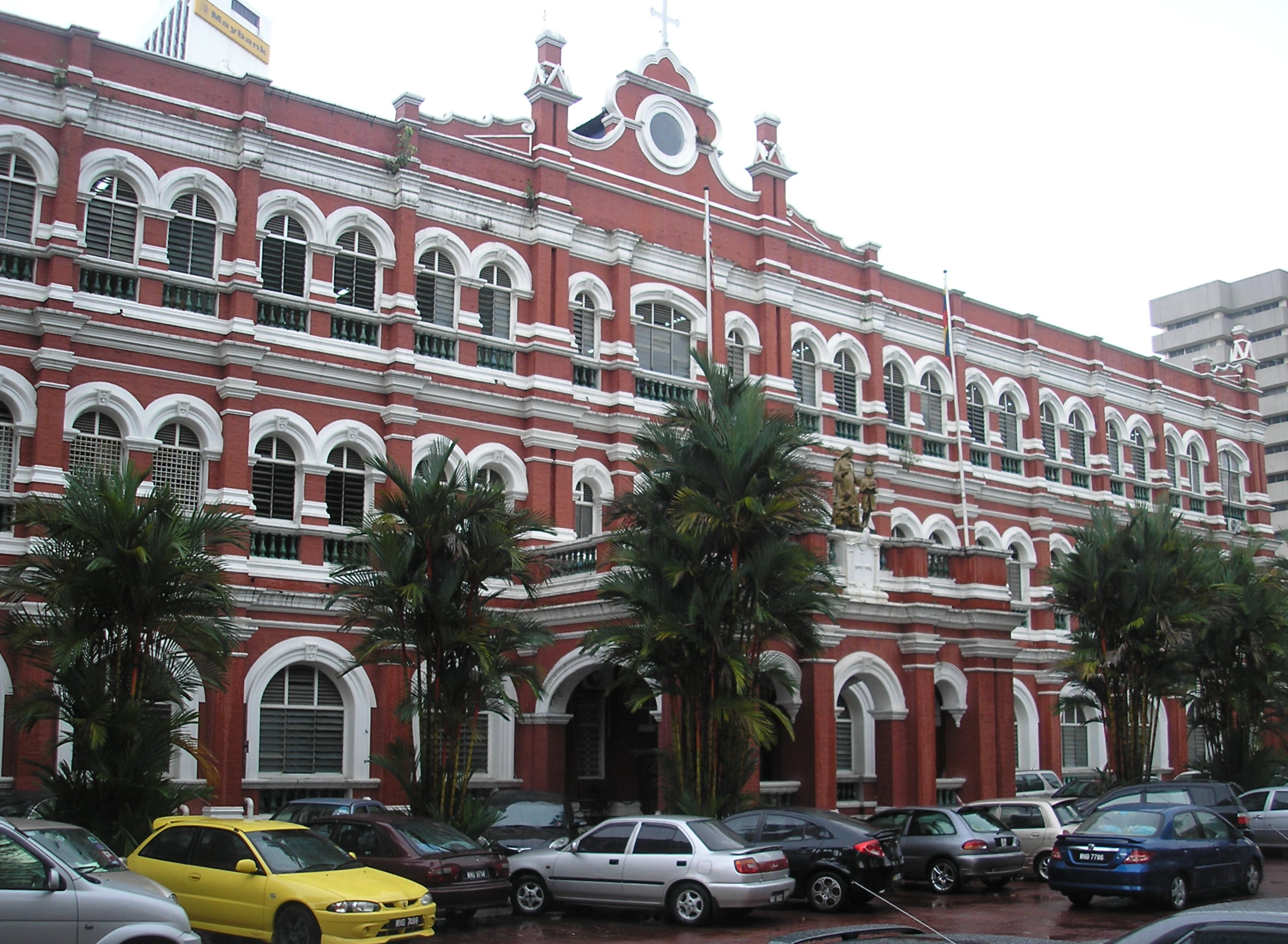
The Secondary Boy's branch of St John's Institution on Bukit Nanas.

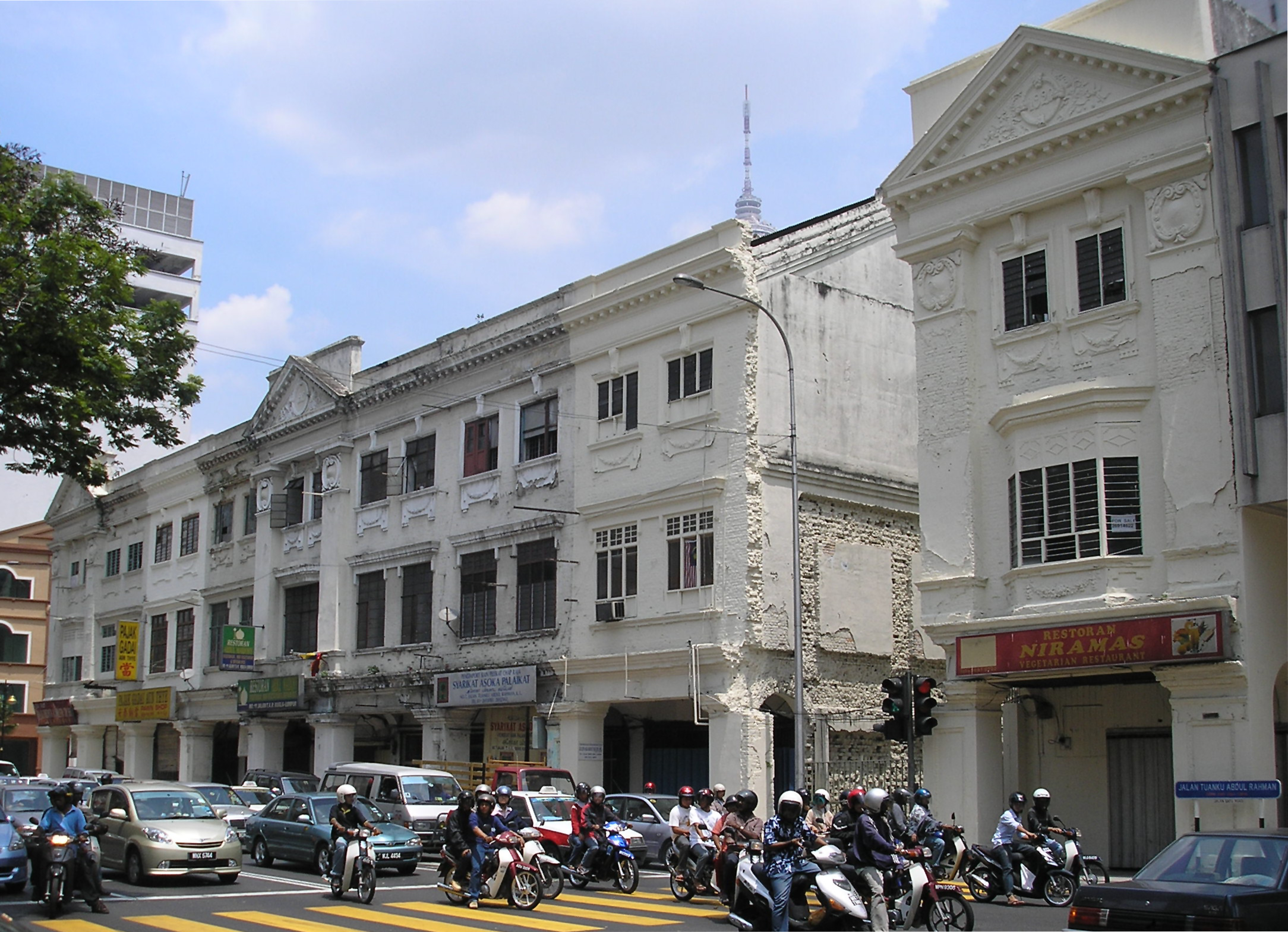
Shophouses at Jalan Tuanku Abdul Rahman (Batu Road).

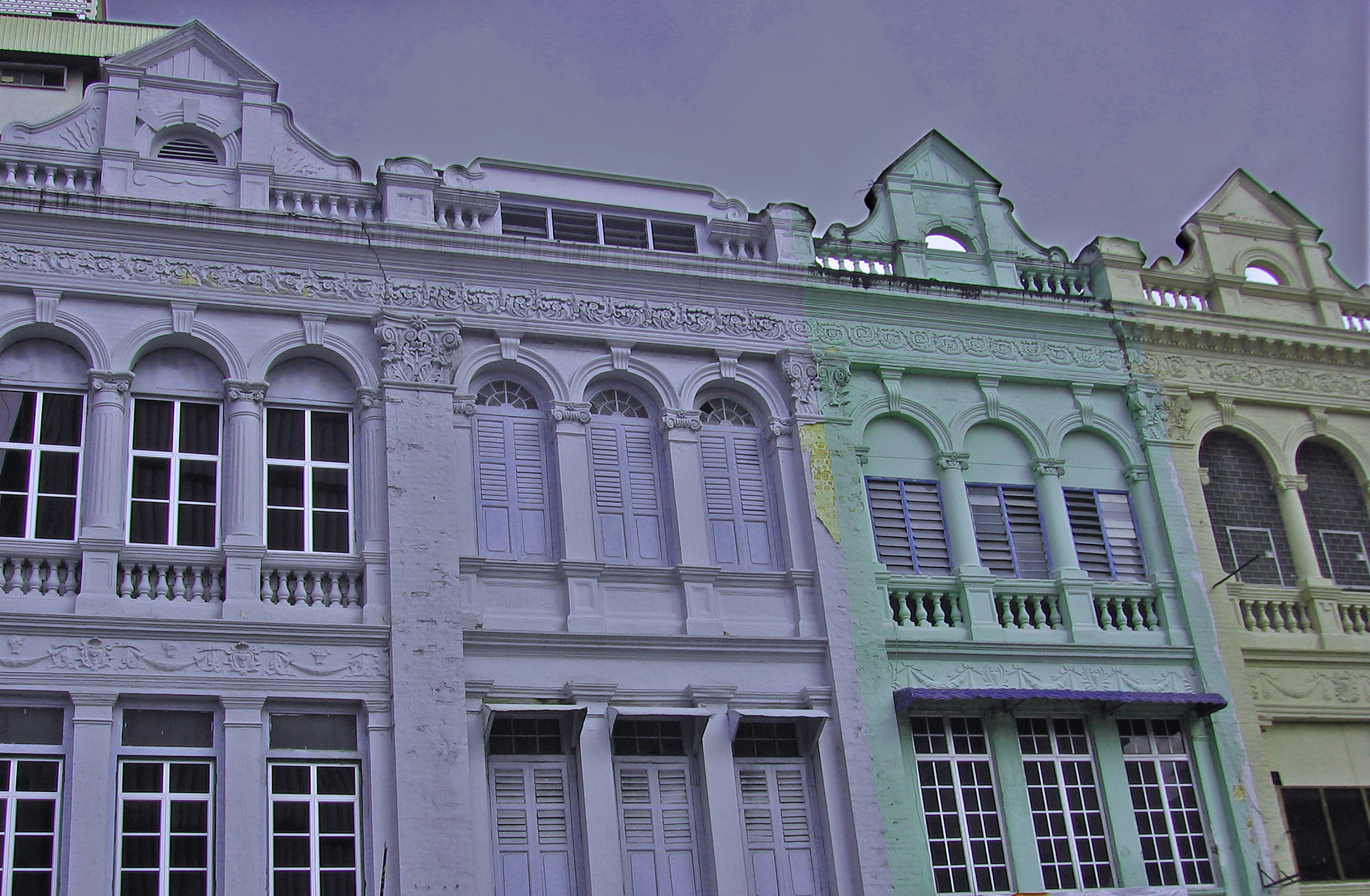
Medan Pasar (Old Market Square) shophouses.

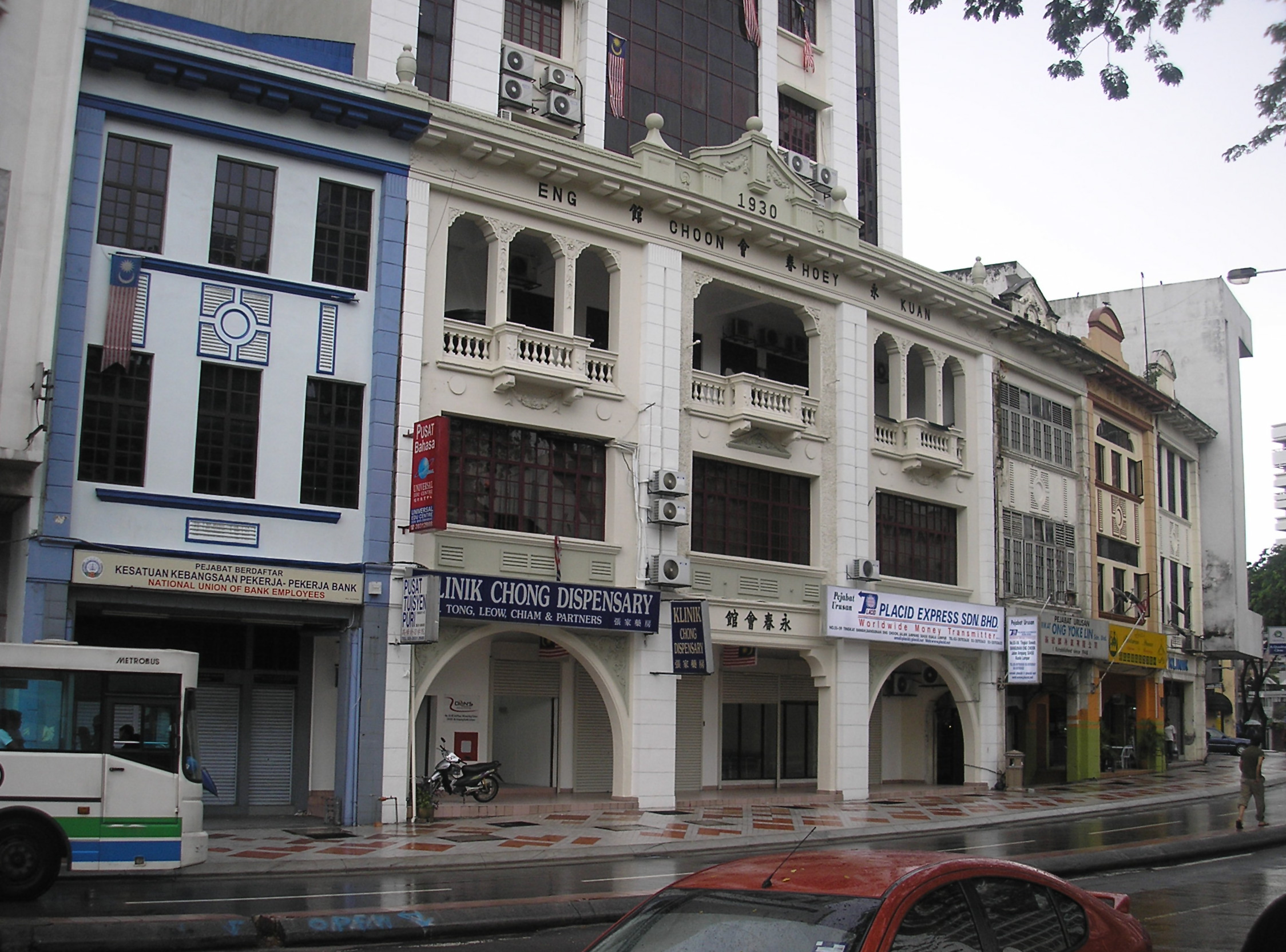
Eng Choon Assembly Hall (1930) at Jalan Ampang.

== Modern Malay ==
Kuala Lumpur today has many iconic modern buildings which drew inspiration from every day traditional Malay items. The buildings were constructed in the 1980s and 1990s. An example of this style of architecture is the Lembaga Tabung Haji (Pilgrims Fund Board) building which is derived from the form of a Malay drum, Telekom Tower which resembles a slanted cut of a bamboo trunk and Maybank Tower, whose design was inspired by the sheath of the keris, the traditional Malay dagger. The buildings were designed by the same architect, Hijjas Kasturi. Istana Budaya is another example of this type of architecture, in which the building is designed based on a Minangkabau head dress. The National Library which is situated beside Istana Budaya is also inspired by the Malay Head Dress.

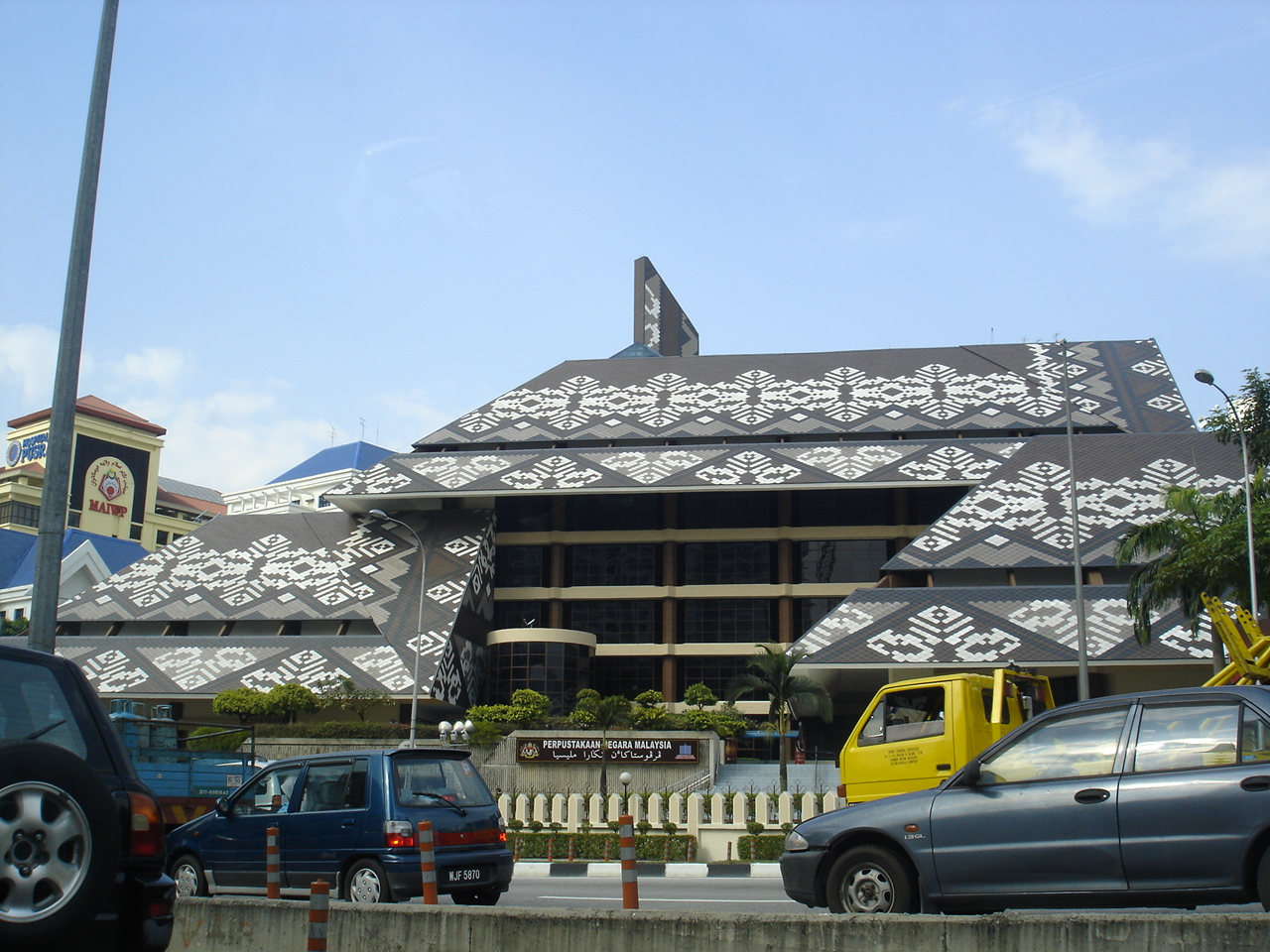
The National Library building in Kuala Lumpur

Menara Telekom

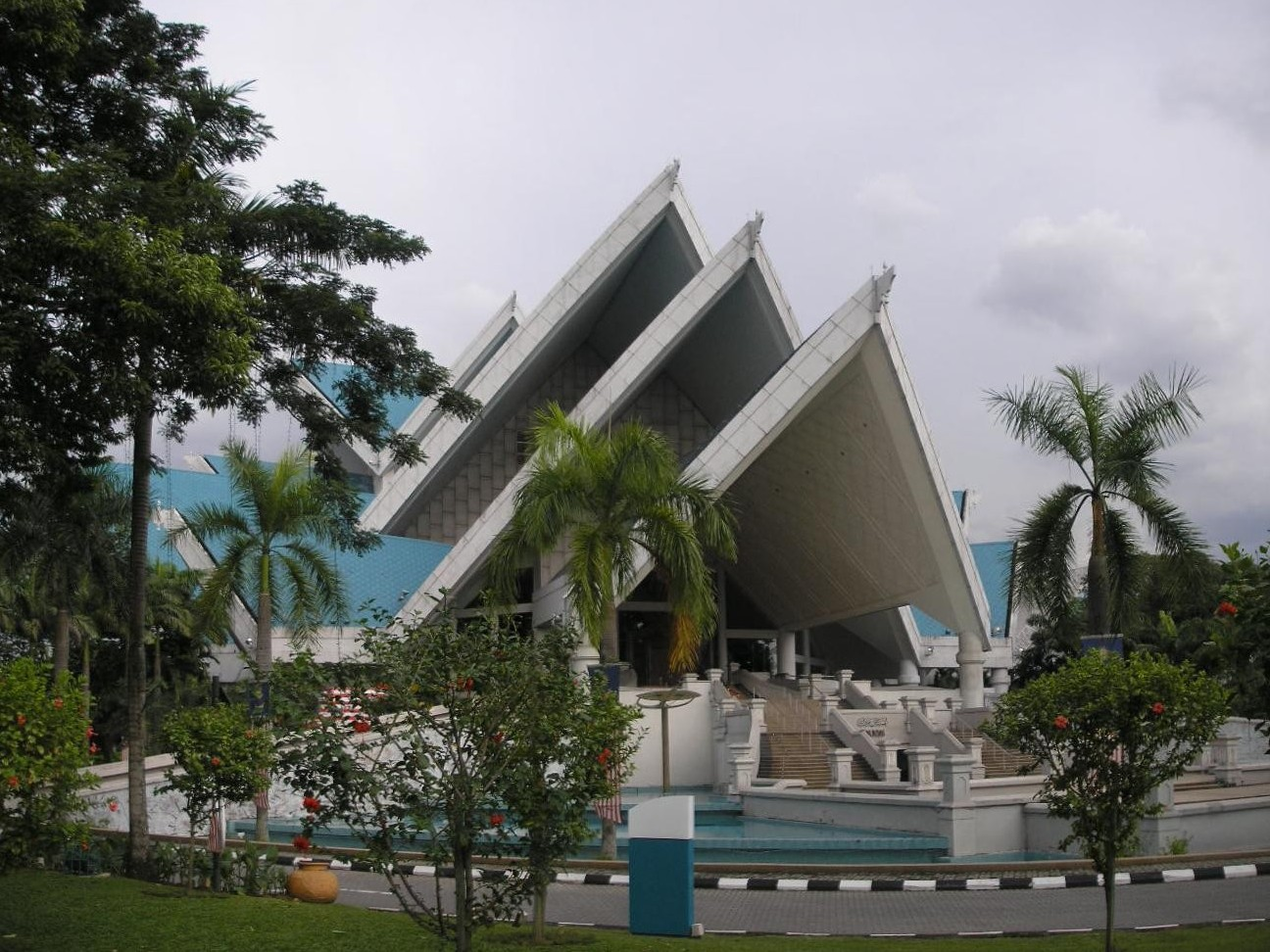
Istana Budaya

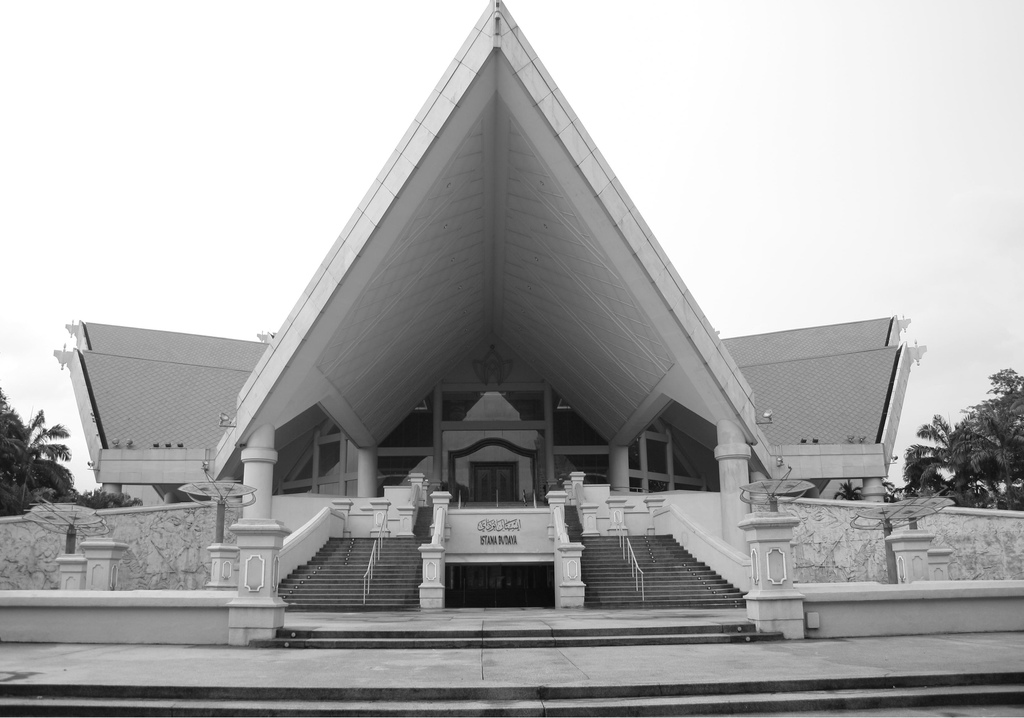
Istana Budaya closeup

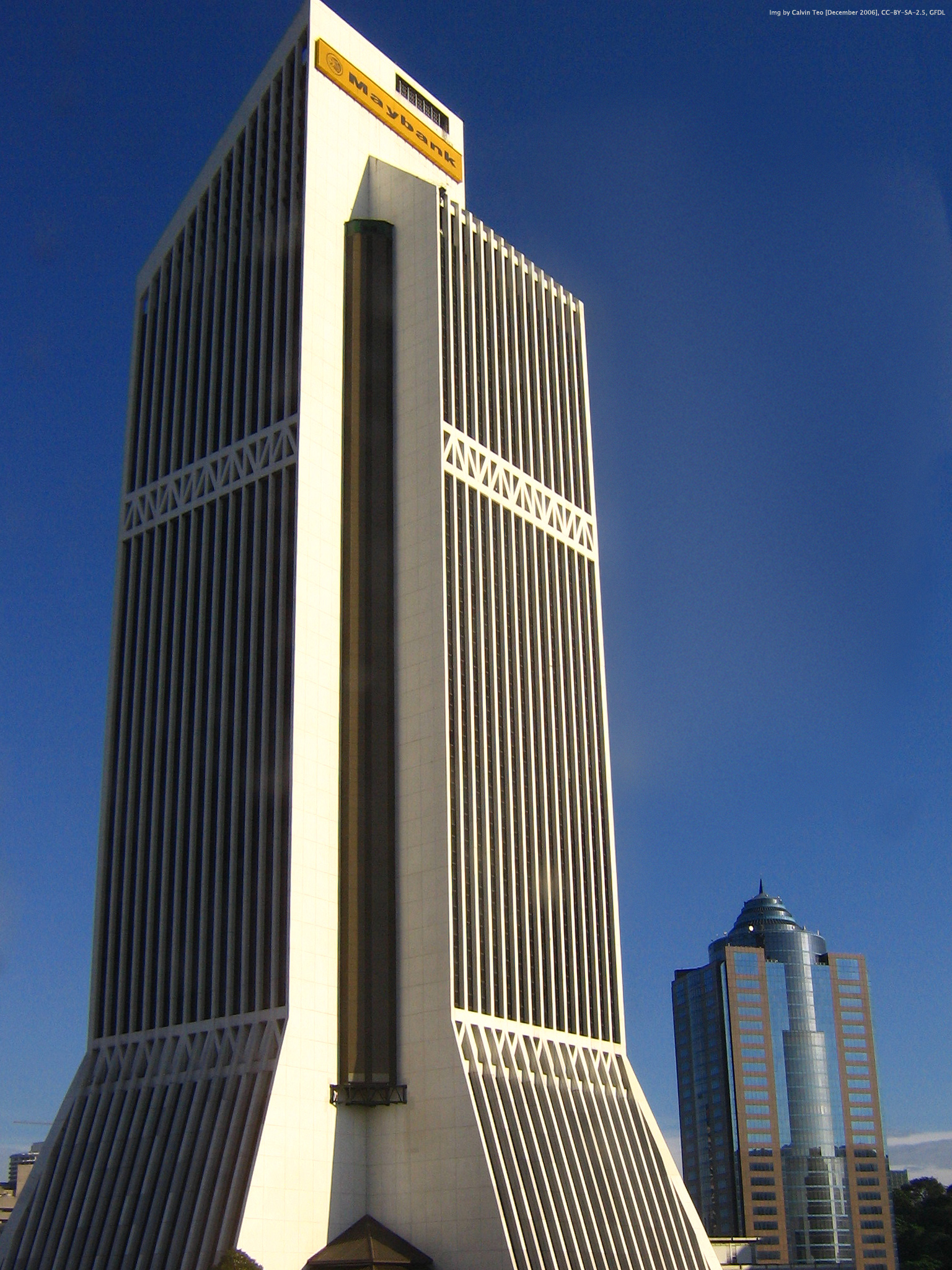
Menara Maybank

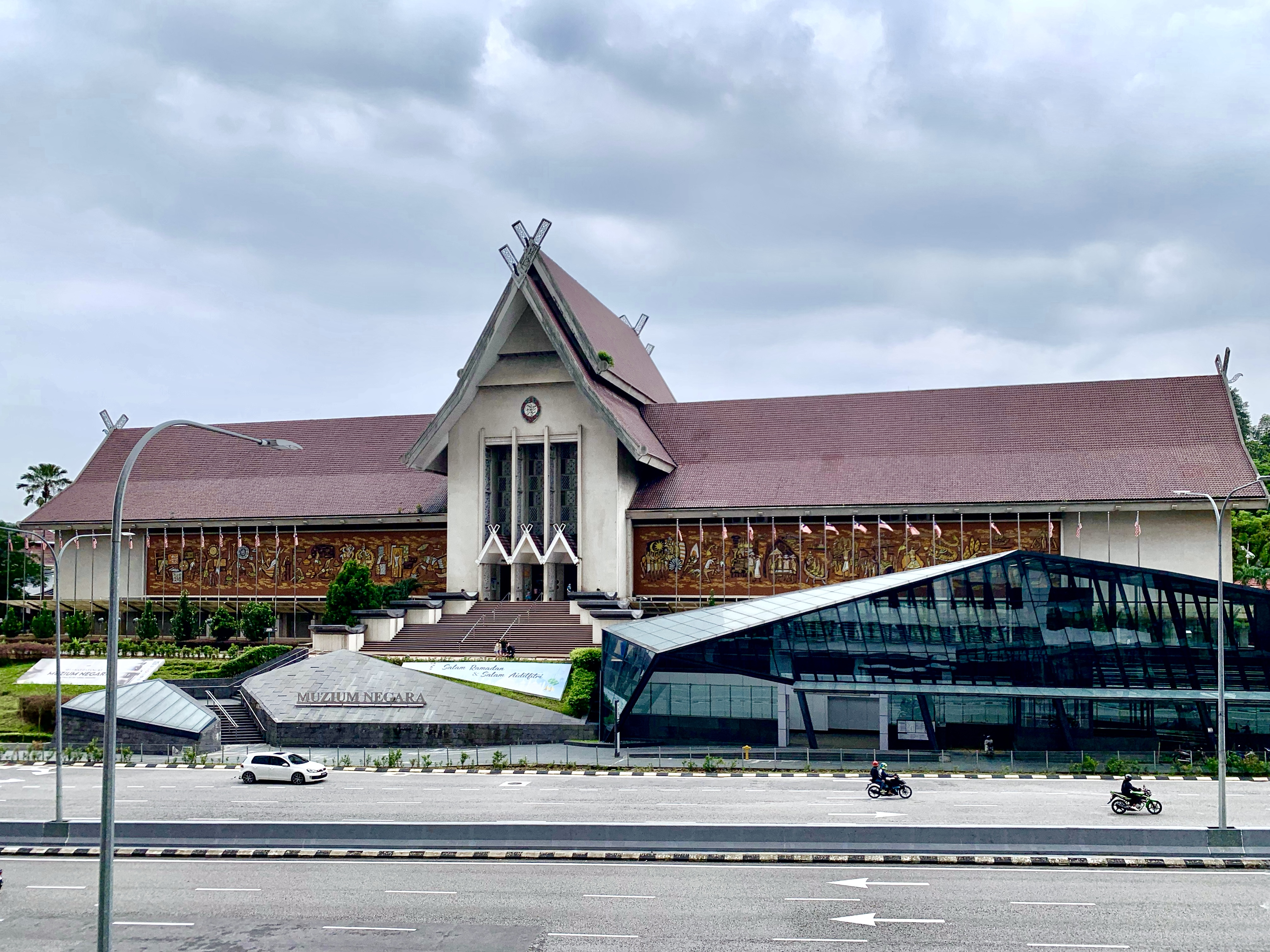
Muzium Negara

== Islamic ==
With Islam being the official religion of Malaysia since independence, there are many Islamic architecture featured buildings that resides in Kuala Lumpur. Buildings like the Dayabumi Complex, and Islamic Center have Islamic geometric motifs on their structure, signifying Islamic restriction on drawing nature. Some buildings such as the Islamic Arts Museum Malaysia and National Planetarium have been built to masquerade itself as a place of worship, complete with dome and minaret, when in fact is a place of science and knowledge. Naturally, Islamic motif are evident in religious structure such as Masjid Wilayah and Masjid Negara. Religious places will have more Arabic calligraphy drawn on the columns and other places on the structure.

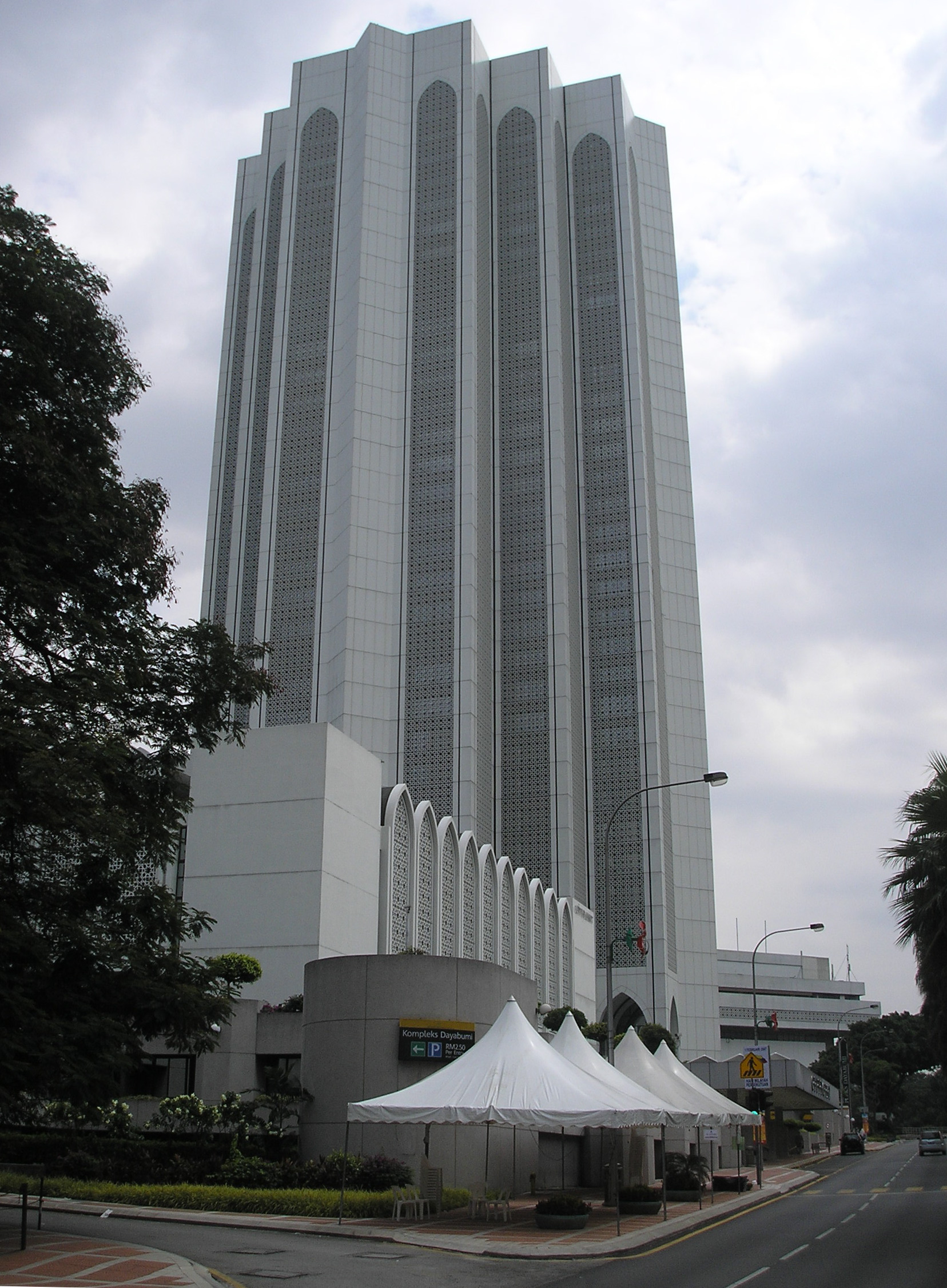
Kompleks Dayabumi

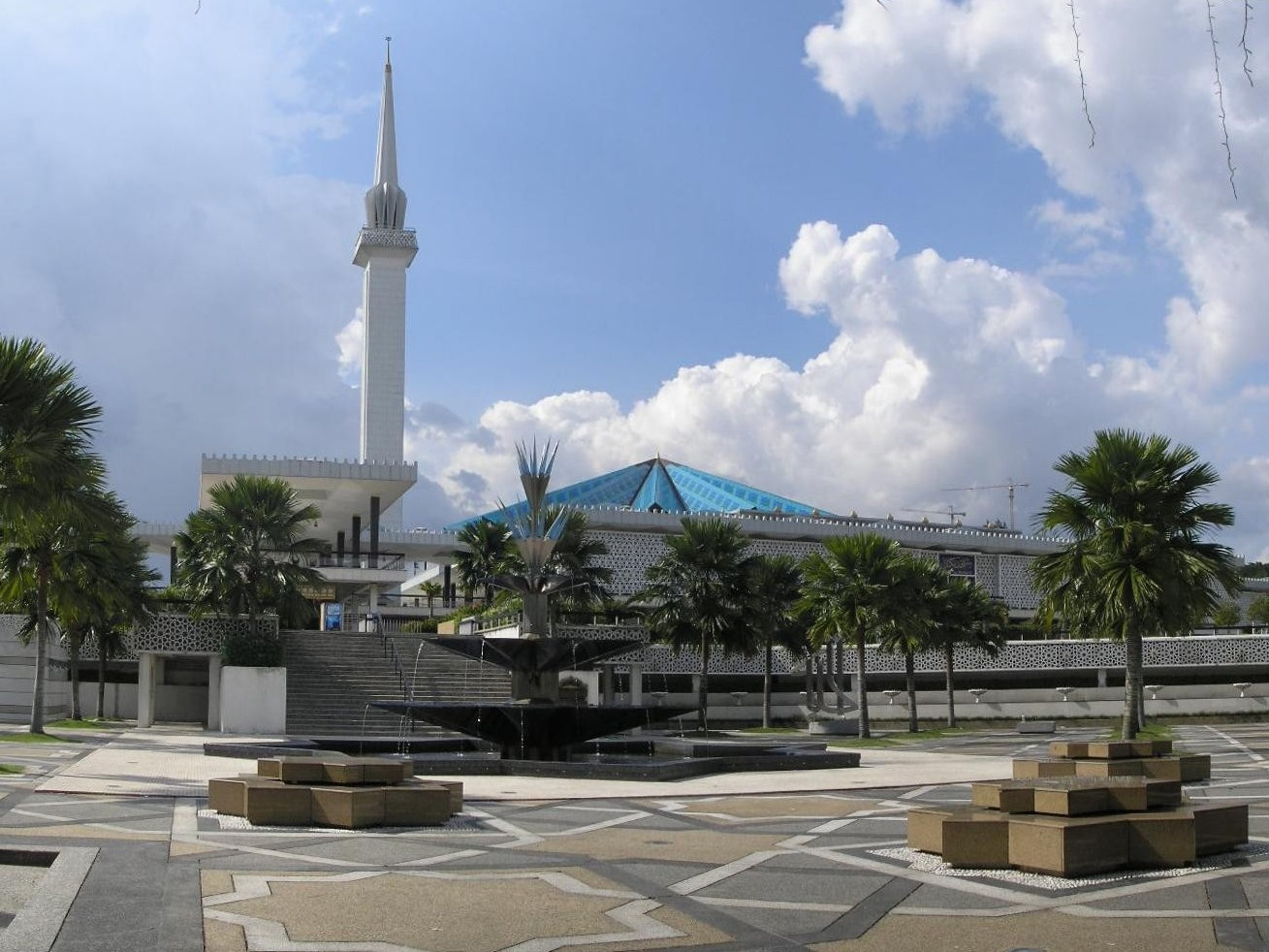
Masjid Negara

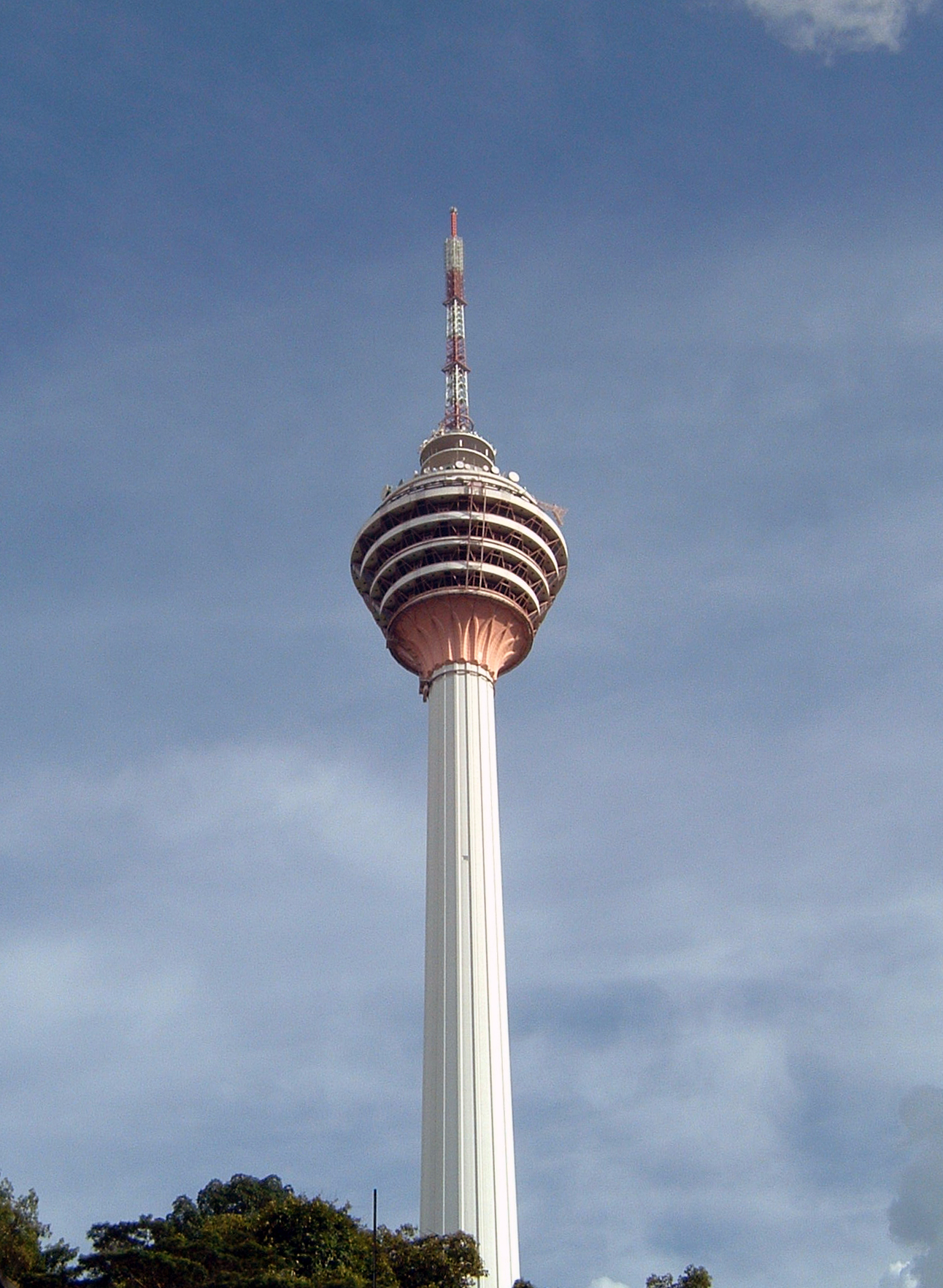
Kuala Lumpur Tower

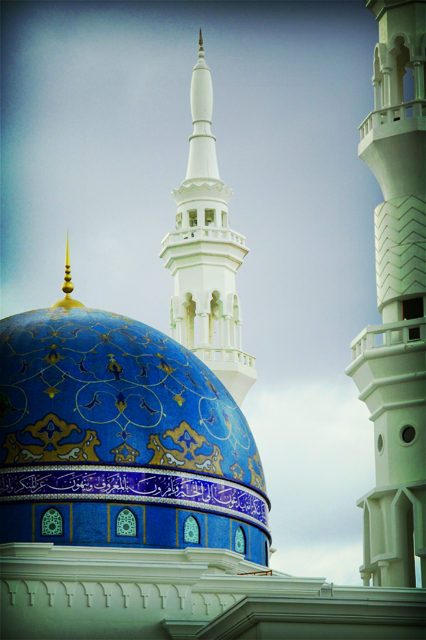
A mosque near KL Monorail's Hang Tuah station

== Late Modernism & Post-Modern ==
Kuala Lumpur's central business district today has shifted around the Kuala Lumpur City Center (KLCC) where many new and tall buildings with Late Modernism and Postmodern architecture fill the skyline. The 452 meter Petronas Twin Towers, designed by César Pelli, when seen from above, resembles the Islamic geometric motifs. While looking from street level, the all-glass shell of the building gives a post-modern take on the more traditional motif. The Kuala Lumpur Convention Centre, next door to the towers follows the same theme. The convention center will have the shape of an eagle if viewed from above, while the all-glass shell of the building gives a more post-modern look.

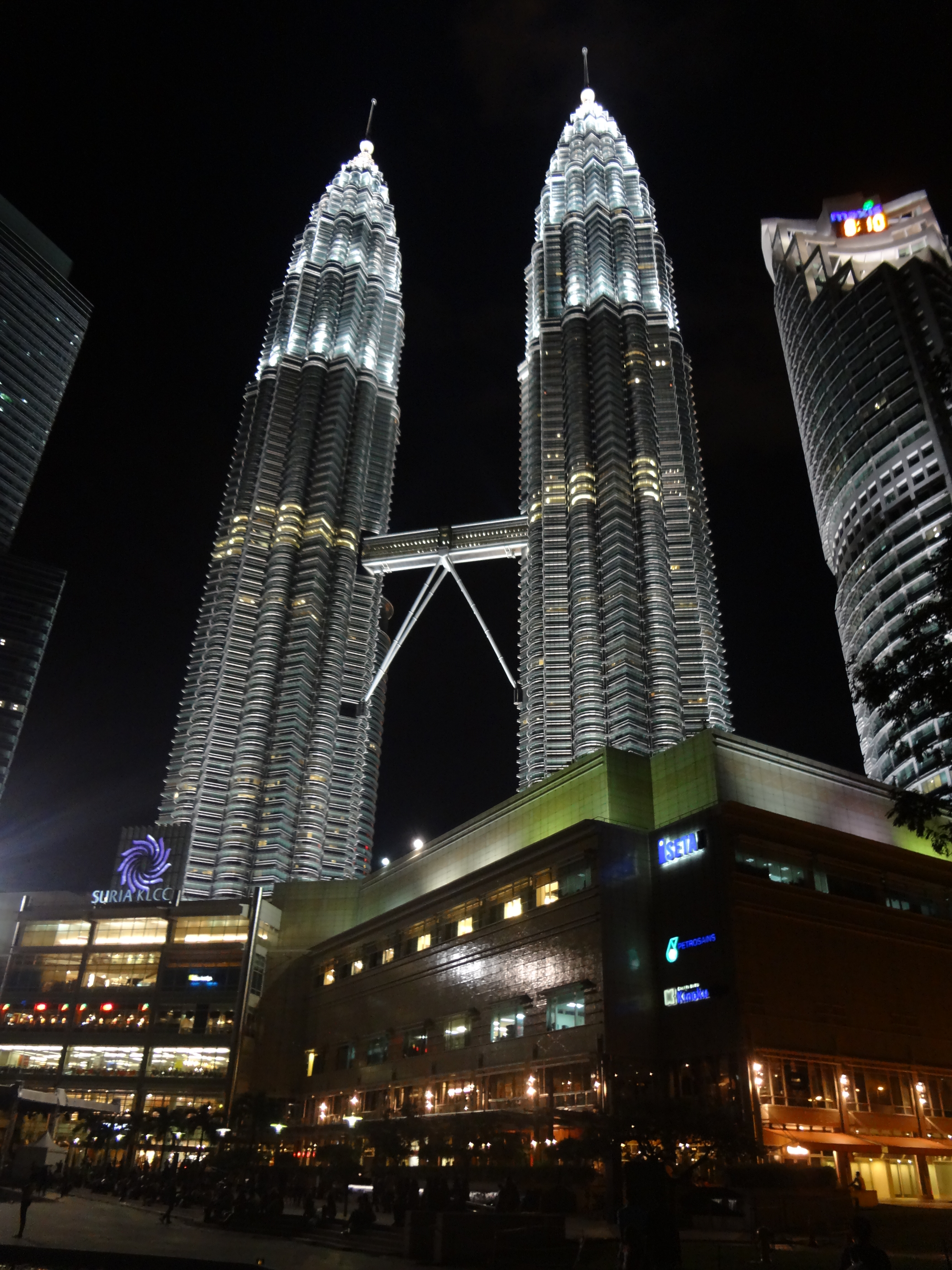
Petronas Twin Towers, Night View

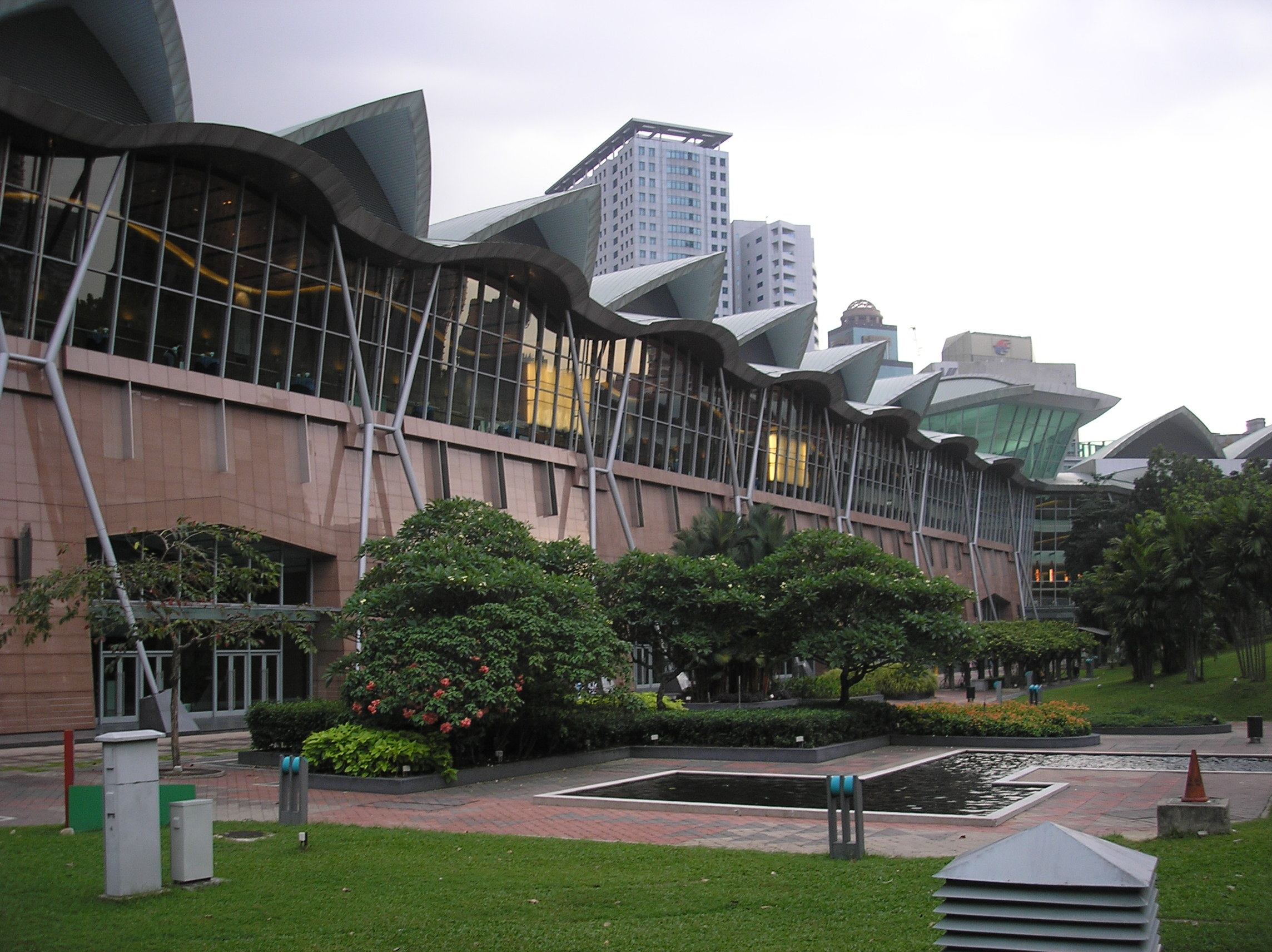
Kuala Lumpur Convention Centre

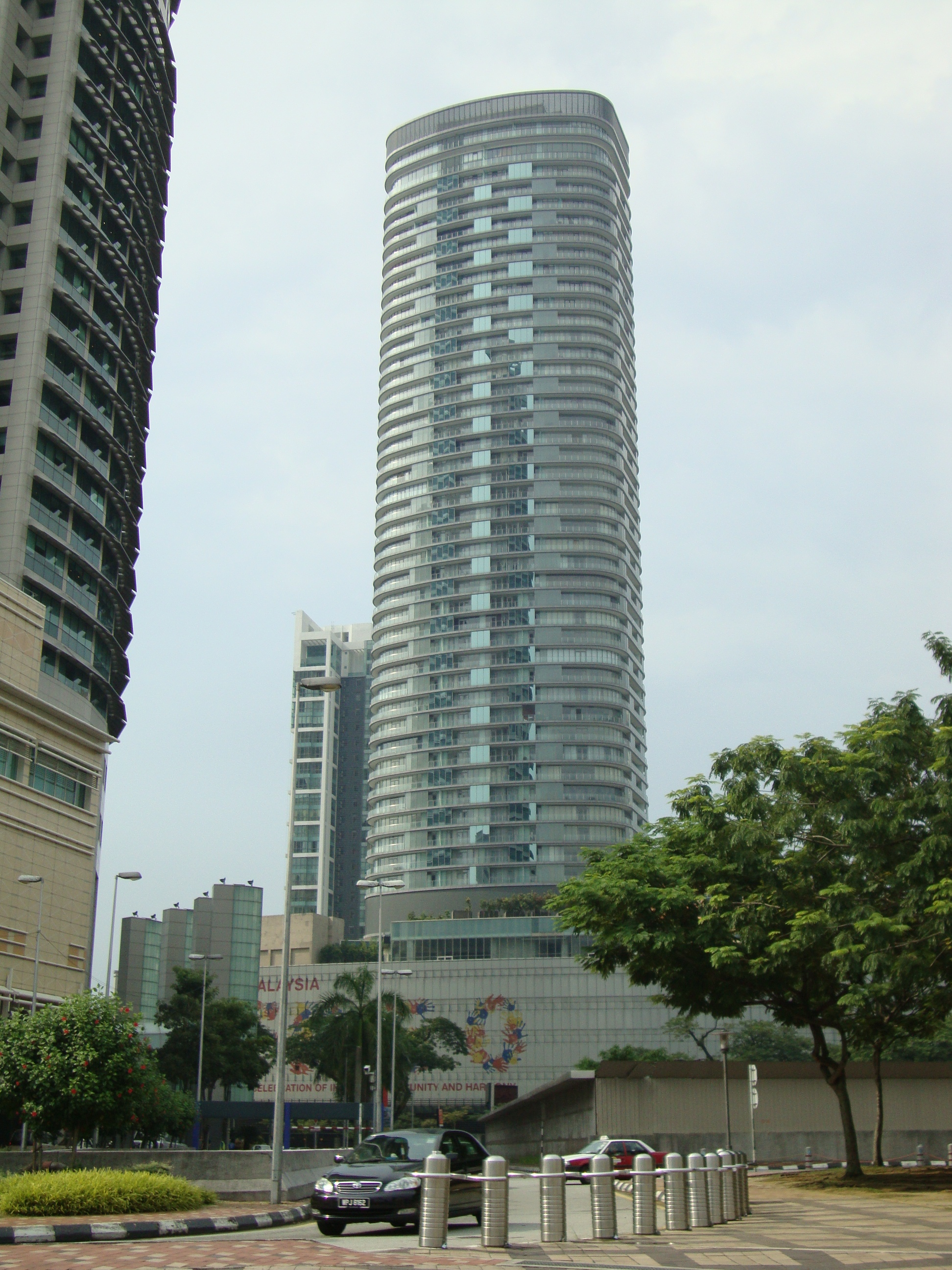
An upscale residential tower along Jalan Ampang in Kuala Lumpur.

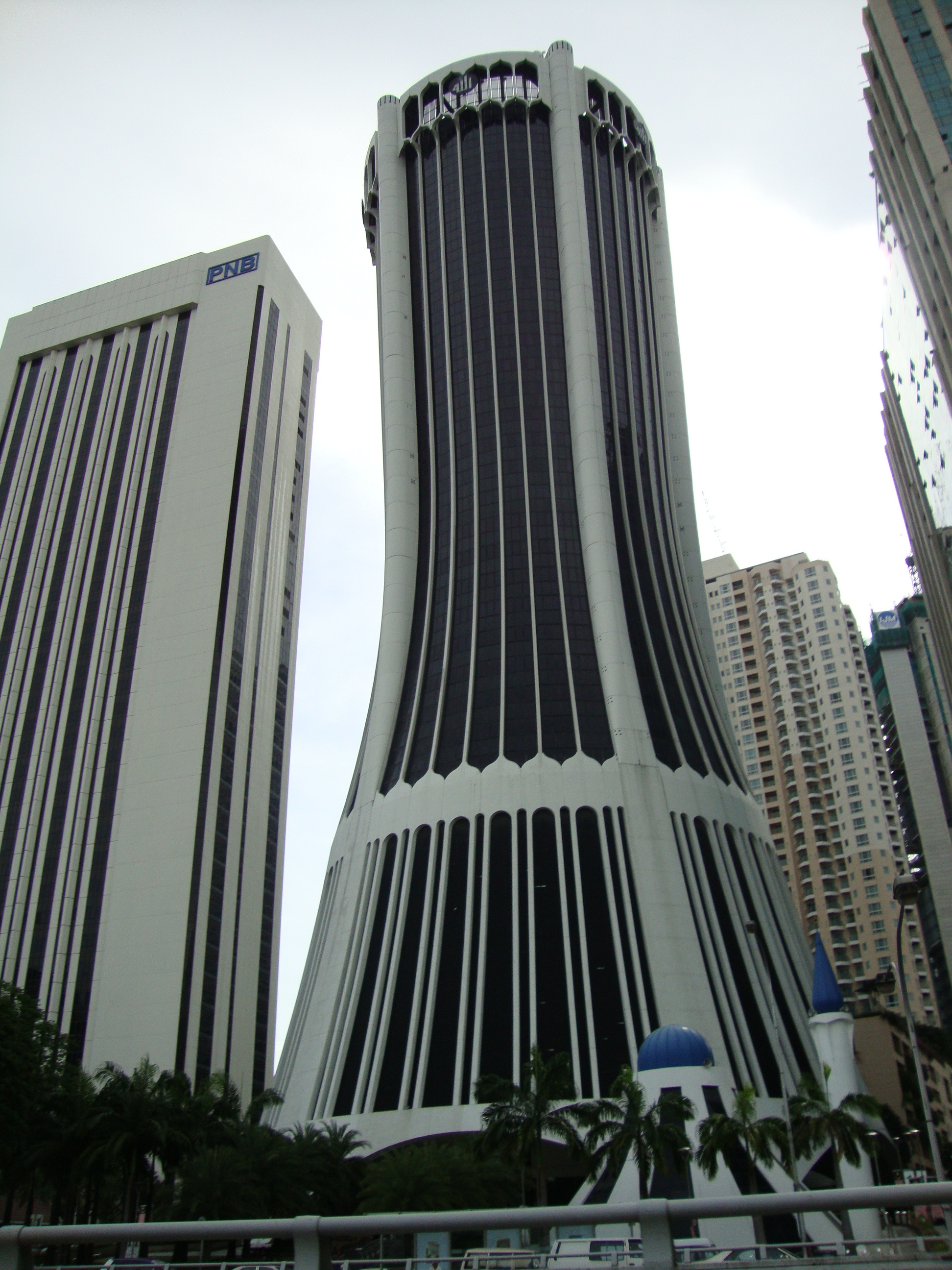
Tabung Haji Headquarters.

== Current Developments ==
As a developing city and a part of a developing nation, there are many construction projects that are currently being built that will change the city's skyline in the near future. Some of the construction project are The Pavilion, The Gardens, Oval Suites, Four Seasons Center and Lot C of KLCC. A lot of the new development has come at the cost of old existing structures. The destruction of the heritage has created controversy, such as the recent destruction of the colonial-era mansion Bok House on Jalan Ampang in 2006 to make way for a 60-story office tower

== Skyline ==
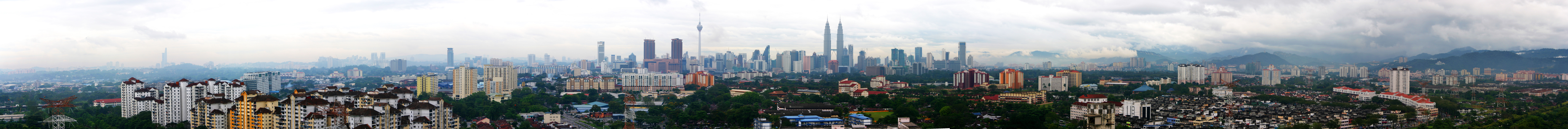
A panoramic view of Kuala Lumpur from Cheras
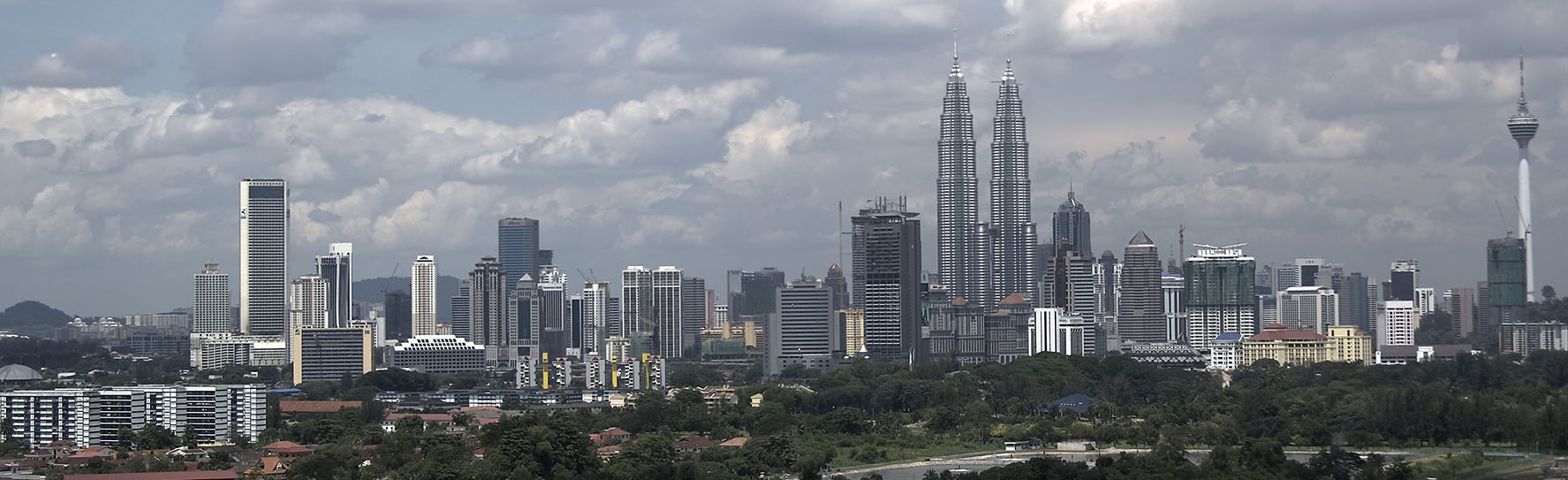
A perspective of Kuala Lumpur from Setapak showing the skyscrapers that dominate the city center.
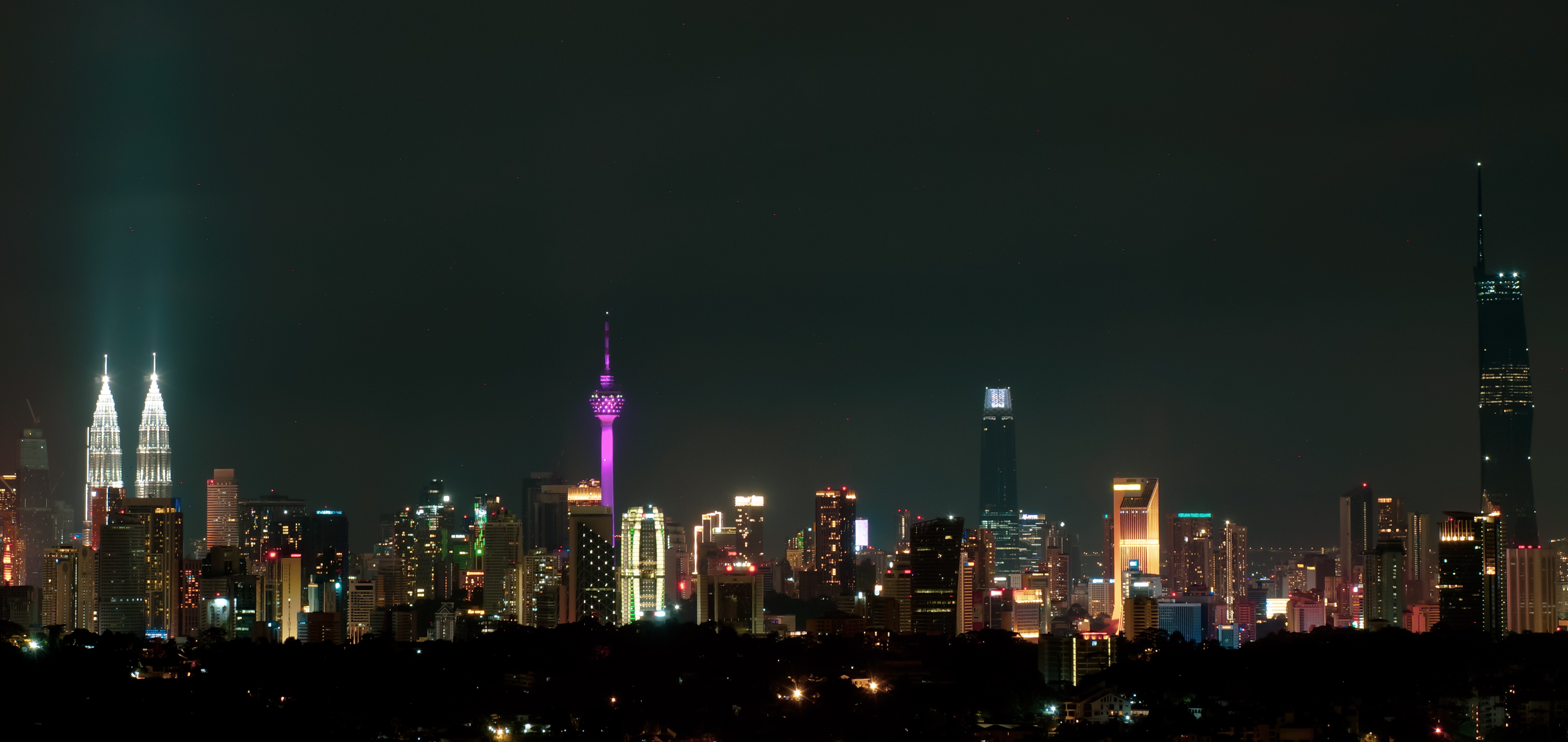
Skyline of Kuala Lumpur from Hartamas in 2024.
