= Hijjas Kasturi =

Malaysian architect (born 1936)

- Born: 26 September 1936 (age 89); Straits Settlements (now Singapore)
- Occupation: Architect
- Years active: 1967–present
- Spouses: Elizabeth Fay Wilson (divorced); Angela Jane Longworth (present)
- Children: 5
- Website: www.hijjas.com

Hijjas bin Kasturi (born 26 September 1936) is a Malaysian architect. Active for more than fifty years, he has been responsible for some of the most significant buildings in South East Asia, in the modern, postmodern, and deconstructivist styles. He is considered the father of Malaysian architecture of the second half of the twentieth century.

== Early life ==
Hijjas was born in Singapore in 26 September 1936. His Chinese mother was raised in Indonesia and then married a Singaporean Javanese. He went to Raffles Institute to continue his secondary education, and he was then granted a scholarship by the Australian Government to study at the University of Adelaide; he eventually graduated from the University of Melbourne. He moved to Malaysia in 1967 and founded the first professional degree program in Malaysia, The School of Art and Architecture at MARA Institute of Technology. In 1977, he founded his own practice, Hijjas Kasturi Associates Sdn (HKAS).

== Career ==
Hijjas started as a Draughtsman with the Singapore Housing Trust in 1956, preparing the Master Plan for Queenstown, and lowcost flats for Singapore. After three years, he joined the South Australian Housing Trust as a Draughtsman preparing the Master Plan for Elizabeth Town, South Australia and various housing schemes.

In 1961, Hijjas became an Architectural Assistant with Brown & Davis, South Australia, working on hospital planning, commercial and religious buildings and housing. In 1965, he became an architect with Hume Proprietary Ltd., Melbourne, Australia planning the construction of factories, warehouses and district offices.

In 1966, Hijjas returned to Singapore and became an Architect/Planner with Urban Renewal Department of the Housing and Development Board of Singapore, in charge of the central transportation terminus study, planning for Ministry of Internal Defence Headquarters and city Development.

However, in 1967, he left Singapore for Malaysia and become the Team leader for feasibility study for the establishment of Institut Teknologi MARA (ITM; now Universiti Teknologi MARA or UiTM). He was also the Founding Head of, School of Art and Architecture, ITM and the Master Planner for ITM Complex at Shah Alam. He was also the architect for MARA Vocational Institute, Malacca.

In 1969, he was the founding principal partner of AkitekBersekutu, subsequently AkitekBersekutu Malaysia. He was also the Founding principal of Hijjas Kasturi Associates Sdn., Architects and Planners.

== Notable buildings ==
Hijjas was the architect of Wisma Equity one of the most prominent brutalist buildings constructed in Malaysia. Located at 150, Jalan Ampang, 50450, Kuala Lumpur, it is on a prominent site and was completed in 1982. It was officially opened in 1983 by Dato Elyas bin Omar. Wisma Equity is an 11 floors office building including a lower ground. It is made of exposed concrete, and the building appears to defy gravity and structure by becoming larger as it rises. In this regard, it bears a formal similarity to Marcel Breuer's Whitney Museum in New York City.

Major buildings designed by Hijjas Kasturi Associates include the Menara Maybank (1987), Tabung Haji (1986), Telekom Tower (2001), Putrajaya International Convention Centre (2004) and the 4G11 Tower in Putrajaya (2008).

== Awards ==
Telekom Tower, by Hijjas Kasturi Associates

- J. Brett Plywood Award, Australia
- Johan Bintang Sarawak, 1988
- Award for Kuching Civic Centre, Association of Engineers, California, USA, 1989
- Asean Award 1990, in recognition of his work in the visual arts (Architecture)
- Nominated to the World Arts Council under the auspices of the World Economic Forum, Davos, Switzerland,1994
- 12th Tokyo Creation Award by Tokyo Fashion Association, Japan, Dec 98
- PAM 2000 Excellence Awards in Recognition of Design Excellence in Commercial Building
- Category on The Securities Commission Headquarters Building, July 2001
- Asean Energy Efficiency Award for Securities Commission Headquarters, Bukit Kiara
- Pertubuhan Akitek Malaysia's Gold Medal Award, Sept 2001 for outstanding works and invaluable contribution in architecture.
- Award in Urban Redevelopment, Conservation and Restoration for Kampung Glam, Singapore by Pertubuhan Perancang Malaysia, Oct, 2001
- Vocational Excellence Award for the recognition of outstanding achievements in the field of Architecture by the Rotary Club of Metro Kuala Lumpur, Oct 2002
- Anjung Seri Creative Council Award for the recognition of outstanding achievements in the field of arts and designs by Berita Publishing SdnBhd, Nov 2002
- BCIA (Building Construction Interchange Asia) Top Ten 2005 Award, February 2005

== Personal life ==
Hijjas married Elizabeth Fay Wilson, an Australian from Melbourne, and the couple had three children who were born in Australia, including daughter Serina Hijjas. Serina Hijjas now serves as director of Hijjas Kasturi Associates Sdn. Hijjas is now married to Angela Jane Longworth, with whom he has two daughters.

In 1994 the couple launched a residency program for artists, writers, performers and choreographers. The residencies are based in heritage buildings that the two restored in Kuala Lumpur and Penang. Over the years the program has provided lodging and sponsorship to more than 100 artists. Hijjas and Angela were both recognized by Forbes Asia as Heroes of Philanthropy in 2011.
