= Shah Alam Stadium =

Demolished multi-purpose stadium in Shah Alam, Malaysia

Shah Alam Stadium Stadium Shah Alam ستاديوم شاه عالم
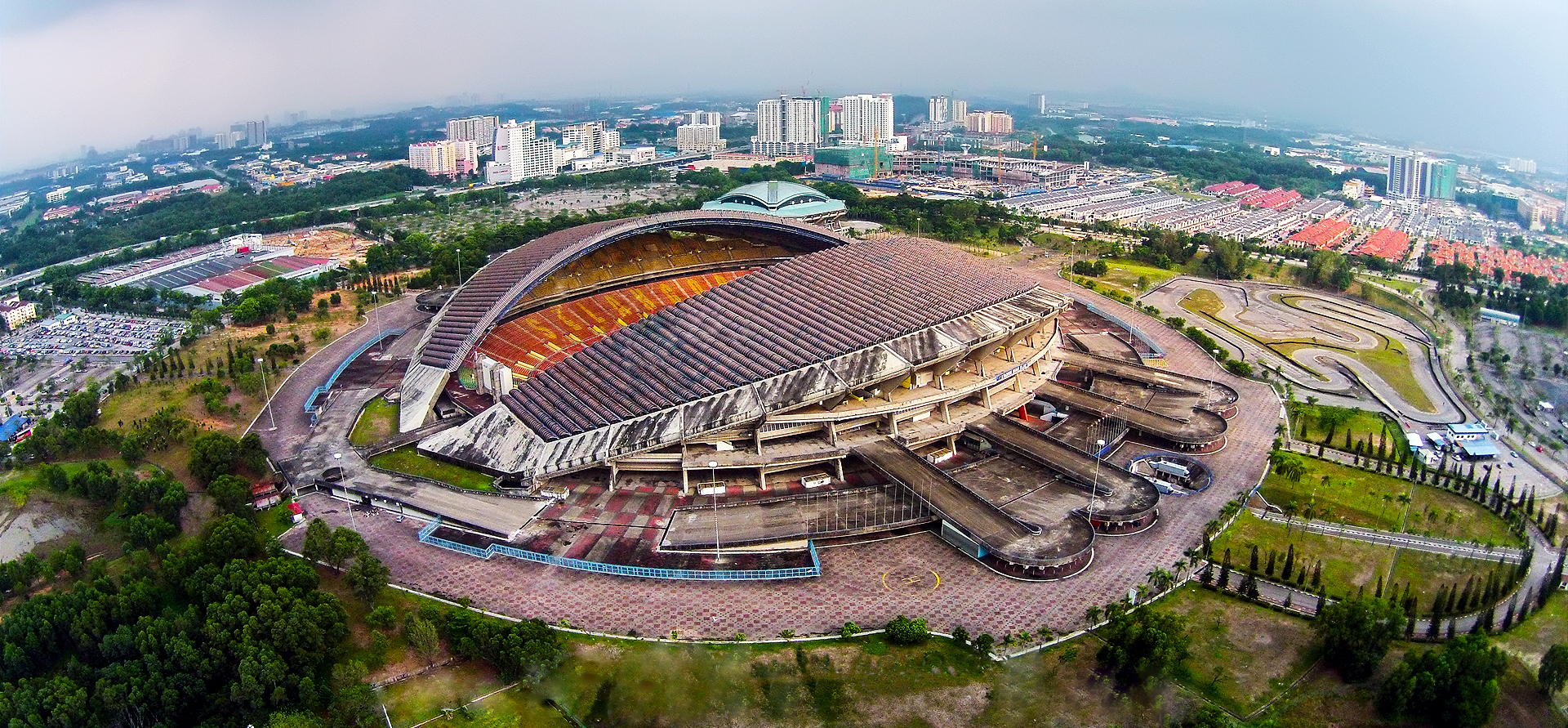
- The original Shah Alam Stadium, was pictured in 2015
- Interactive map of Shah Alam Stadium; Stadium Shah Alam ستاديوم شاه عالم
- Address: Persiaran Sukan, Seksyen 13, 40000 Shah Alam
- Location: Shah Alam, Selangor, Malaysia
- Coordinates: 3°4′56.1″N 101°32′41.8″E
- Owner: State Government of Selangor
- Operator: Darul Ehsan Facilities Management Sdn. Bhd.
- Capacity: 80,372
- Surface: Grass, Track and field
- Scoreboard: Digital scoreboard
- Public transit: KD10 Batu Tiga Komuter station; SA10 Stadium Shah Alam LRT station; SA02 SA05 Smart Selangor Bus

Construction
- Groundbreaking: 1 January 1990; 36 years ago
- Opened: 16 July 1994; 32 years ago
- Closed: 2020; 6 years ago
- Reopened: 2030 as Shah Alam Sports Complex (Kompleks Sukan Shah Alam)
- Demolished: 2024–2025
- Cost: RM480 million
- Architect: Hijjas Kasturi Associates Sdn. Bhd.

Tenants
- Selangor (1994–2020); PKNS (2016–2019)

The original and former Shah Alam Stadium (Malay: Stadium Shah Alam) was a multi-purpose stadium and one of the largest stadiums in the world located in Shah Alam, Selangor, Malaysia. The stadium was the official home of the Red Giants (Selangor) since 16 July 1994, and had a capacity of 80,372. It was used mostly for football matches but also had facilities for athletics.

Despite multiple renovation attempts over the years, the long-term lack of adequate maintenance left the stadium in a state of disrepair. In 2020, after the Malaysian Football League (MFL) announced that the dilapidated condition of the stadium's polycarbonate roof and pitch are inedequate for hosting any Malaysia Super League matches, it was closed down for a thorough reconstruction. On 15 July 2022, the Menteri Besar of Selangor Amirudin Shari said that Selangor government has appointed Malaysian Resources Corporation Berhad (MRCB) to refurbish the stadium and its surrounding sporting facilities which may cost up to RM787 million. However the closure turned permanent afterwards as decision was taken to knock down the venue. The demolition works began on 1 July 2024 and were finished on 27 January 2025.

== Overview ==
Consisting of huge six level semi-enclosed spaces, it was a copy of HNK Hajduk Split's Poljud stadium in Split, Croatia (built in 1979). It was the biggest stadium in Malaysia before the completion of the Bukit Jalil National Stadium. The frame structure has been the longest free-standing arc in the world. The stadium was designed by a well known Malaysian Architect, Hijjaz Kasturi.

The stadium has around 5,500 car bays in parking lots surrounding the stadium. The stadium has become the major landmark in Shah Alam due to its scale and magnificent architecture. Other than sporting facilities, the stadium also has a go-kart racing circuit.

== History ==
Built for the 1998 Commonwealth Games, construction began on 1 January 1990 at a cost of RM 469 million. A half-marathon was held in December 1993 as part of celebrations for the opening of the stadium.

The stadium was officially opened on 16 July 1994 with a series of international friendly matches sponsored by Matsushita. Dundee United played a Selangor selection in the first game of an invitational tournament, drawing 1–1. The first goal at the stadium was scored by Billy McKinlay. Other teams in the tournament were Bayern Munich, Leeds United, the Australian Olympic team "Olyroos", and Flamengo (who won the tournament). The international friendly matches only attracted 5,000 spectators each and was seen as an "amateur competition".

The Malaysia Cup finals was held in the stadium for the first time in December 1994. Bon Jovi made its debut Malaysian concert in the stadium on 4 May 1995.

Once, Universiti Teknologi MARA's (UiTM) Faculty of Performing Arts occupied a portion of the stadium as its faculty building prior to the completion of the Puncak Perdana satellite campus of the university.

In 2011, RM 3.4 million was spent by the Selangor government to renovate the stadium to upgrade the lighting system, roof repairs, new grass for the pitch as well as to replace vandalised seats, improving the sound system, upgrading the dressing rooms, repainting some parts of the stadium, repairing the washrooms as well as other facilities. In 2014, RM 2.4mil was spent for the second phase of upgrading works, which includes replacing more than 500 roof tiles, replacing grass on the damaged parts of the field with the seashore paspalum variety, upgrading the changing rooms and toilets, repairing the public address system and two generator sets.

Since December 2015, on several occasions Shah Alam Stadium has been closed for maintenance work. Works in 2016 were needed to prepare it for the Malaysia Super League (MSL) season. These included replowing the field and resurfacing with ‘cow grass’, which costs about RM200,000, and was completed by 19 March. The lighting system was also upgraded from 1,200 lux to 2,000 lux. All these were completed before the opening match between Selangor and Kedah on 5 April.

The demolition of the stadium started in 2024 with expectation to take until mid-2025. The stadium was completely torn down on 27 January 2025.

== Matches ==
=== 2007 AFF Championship ===
The semi-final match between Malaysia and Singapore was held here on the first leg tie, replaced the Bukit Jalil National Stadium on renovation for the 2007 AFC Asian Cup. The match ended 1–1 draw, with a goals of Mohammad Hardi Jaafar for Malaysia and Noh Alam Shah for Singapore.

=== Exhibition match ===
On 29 July 2008, an exhibition match was played between the Malaysia Select team and Chelsea. The match ended in a 2–0 win for the English side, courtesy of goals from Nicolas Anelka and Ashley Cole. Fellow Premier League club Arsenal took on a Malaysia XI team on 13 July 2011, as part of the club's Asia Tour.

=== 2014 AFF Championship ===
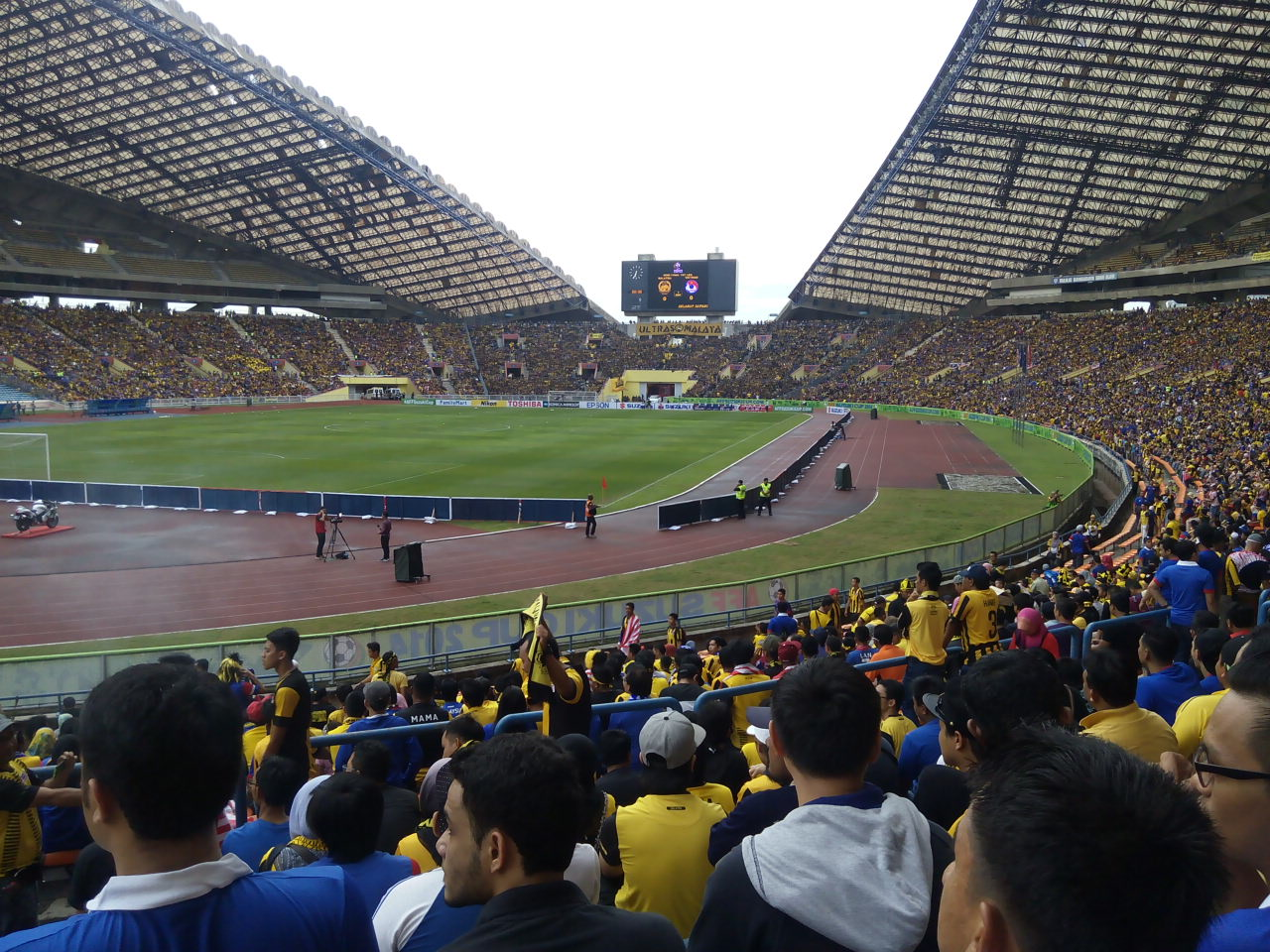
Match between Malaysia and Vietnam during the AFF Championship in 2014

The semi-final match between Malaysia and Vietnam was held here on the first leg tie. The score ended 1–2 to away team. Safiq Rahim scores a brace from a penalty spot.

=== Malaysia Cup matches ===
1994 Malaysia Cup Final

The first Malaysia Cup Final held at the Shah Alam Stadium was on 17 December 1994 (68th edition) when Singapore FA defeated Pahang FA 4–0. Goals from Abbas Saad (Hat-trick) and Fandi Ahmad became the fourth team to claim the double, FAM Dunhill Liga Perdana and FAM Dunhill Piala Malaysia after Johor FA in 1991, Pahang FA in 1992, and Kedah FA in 1993. Fandi Ahmad lifted the trophy in front of more than 50,000 Singaporean fans that traveled to the stadium. It was Singapore's FA 24th Malaysia Cup title since their last triumph in 1980.

The 2011-2013 and 2015-2018 editions of the Malaysia Cup were held at Shah Alam Stadium.

In the 2015 Malaysia Cup, it was considered as a home advantage for Shah Alam Stadium tenants, Selangor FA. The match was also considered as a déjà vu of the 2015 Malaysia Cup. Again in 2018 Malaysia Cup final between Perak vs Terengganu has been held in this stadium. This game was a dramatic final inducing two red cards for both teams, fighting, and two last-minute goals for Perak. Draw 3-3 after extra time and won by penalty shootout 4-1 for Perak TBG.

== Recent tournament results ==
=== 1997 FIFA World Youth Championship ===
Date	Time (UTC+08)	Team #1	Res.	Team #2	Round	Attendance
16 June 1997	21:00	Malaysia	1–3	Morocco	Group Stage	25,000
17 June 1997	20:00	Uruguay	3–0	Belgium	Group Stage	2,000
19 June 1997	17:30	Malaysia	1–3	Uruguay	Group Stage	10,000
19 June 1997	20:00	Morocco	1–1	Belgium	Group Stage	8,000
22 June 1997	17:30	Malaysia	0–3	Belgium	Group Stage	25,000
22 June 1997	20:00	Morocco	0–0	Uruguay	Group Stage	25,000
25 June 1997	17:30	Uruguay	3–0	United States	Round of 16	2,500
25 June 1997	20:30	Republic of Ireland	2–1 (a.e.t.)	Morocco	Round of 16	3,000
29 June 1997	17:00	Uruguay	1–1 (a.e.t.) (7–6 pen.)	France	Quarter-finals	9,000
29 June 1997	20:00	Spain	0–1	Republic of Ireland	Quarter-finals	9,000
2 July 1997	20:30	Uruguay	3–2 (a.e.t.)	Ghana	Semi-finals	15,000
5 July 1997	17:30	Ghana	1–2	Republic of Ireland	Third place play-off	28,000
5 July 1997	20:30	Uruguay	1–2	Argentina	Final	62,000

=== 2001 Southeast Asian Games ===
Date	Time (UTC+08)	Team #1	Res.	Team #2	Round	Attendance
13 September 2001		Malaysia	1–0	Myanmar	Semi-finals	N/A
15 September 2001		Malaysia	0–1	Thailand	Final match	N/A

=== 2007 AFF Championship ===
Date	Time (UTC+08)	Team #1	Res.	Team #2	Round	Attendance
23 January 2007	20:00	Malaysia	1–1	Singapore	Semifinals first leg	40,000

=== 2007 AFC U-16 Women's Championship ===
Date	Time (UTC+08)	Team #1	Res.	Team #2	Round	Attendance
14 March 2007	17:00	China	1–3	Japan	Semi-finals	80
14 March 2007	20:00	North Korea	4–1	South Korea	Semi-finals	120

=== 2007 AFC Asian Cup ===
Date	Time (UTC+08)	Team #1	Res.	Team #2	Round	Attendance
18 July 2007	20:30	Uzbekistan	3–0	China	Group Stage	2,200

=== 2014 AFF Championship ===
Date	Time (UTC+08)	Team #1	Res.	Team #2	Round	Attendance
7 December 2014	20:00	Malaysia	1–2	Vietnam	Semifinals first leg	N/A

=== 2017 Southeast Asian Games ===
Date	Time (UTC+08)	Team #1	Res.	Team #2	Round	Attendance
14 August 2017	20:45	Malaysia	2–1	Brunei	Group Stage	N/A
15 August 2017	16:00	Indonesia	1–1	Thailand	Group Stage	N/A
16 August 2017	20:45	Singapore	1–2	Malaysia	Group Stage	N/A
17 August 2017	16:00	Vietnam	4–1	Cambodia	Group Stage	N/A
17 August 2017	20:45	Indonesia	3–0	Philippines	Group Stage	N/A
20 August 2017	20:45	Philippines	0–4	Vietnam	Group Stage	N/A
21 August 2017	20:45	Malaysia	3–1	Myanmar	Group Stage	N/A
23 August 2017	20:45	Laos	1–3	Malaysia	Group Stage	N/A
24 August 2017	16:00	Indonesia	2–0	Cambodia	Group Stage	N/A
26 August 2017	20:45	Malaysia	1–0	Indonesia	Semi-finals	N/A
29 August 2017	20:45	Malaysia	0–1	Thailand	Gold medal match	N/A

== In popular culture ==
Shah Alam Stadium was featured in a challenge in the first leg of The Amazing Race Asia 1 where teams had to ride go-karts around the circuit.

== See also ==
- Sport in Malaysia
- List of Southeast Asia stadiums by capacity
