= Maybank Numismatic Museum =

Museum in Kuala Lumpur, Malaysia

Coordinates: 3.1472244°N 101.6971532°E

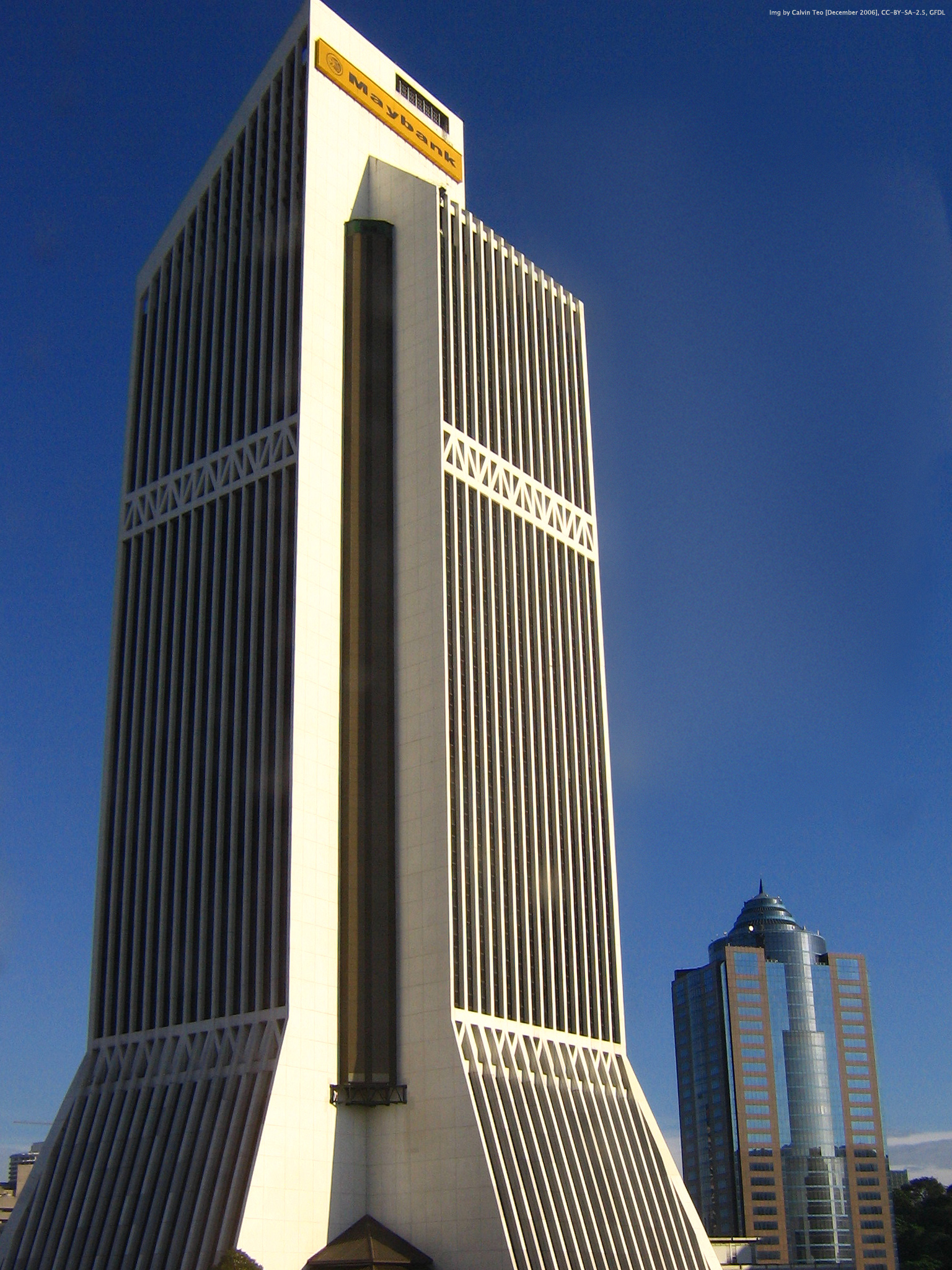
Maybank Tower, which houses the museum.

The Maybank Numismatic Museum is a museum in Kuala Lumpur, Malaysia, that is run and owned by the Maybank. It holds one of the largest coin and money collections in Malaysia. The museum is housed in Maybank Tower at Jalan Tun Perak. In September 2012, the museum was closed to the public for renovations, and has subsequently been reopened.

== Transportation ==
The museum is accessible within walking distance north west of Plaza Rakyat LRT Station of RapidKL.

== See also ==
- List of museums in Malaysia
