= Hijjas Kasturi Associates =

Malaysian architecture and planning firm industry

- Industry: Architectural and planning, construction
- Founded: 1977; 49 years ago
- Founder: Hijjas Kasturi
- Headquarters: Kuala Lumpur, Malaysia
- Key people: Serina Hijjas
- Website: www.hijjas.com

Hijjas Kasturi Associates Sdn. (also known as HIJJAS Architects & Planners) is a Malaysian architecture and planning firm based in Kuala Lumpur.

== History ==
It was founded in 1977 by Malaysian architect Hijjas Kasturi and specializes in designing institutional and commercial buildings in Malaysia. The company is currently led by Hijjas Kasturi's daughter, Serina Hijjas.

== Notable buildings ==
- Tabung Haji (1986)
- Menara Maybank (1989)
- Alor Setar Tower (1997)
- Telekom Tower (2002)
- Putrajaya International Convention Centre (2003)
