= Church of the Holy Rosary, Kuala Lumpur =

Church in Kuala Lumpur, Malaysia

Coordinates: 3°08′12″N 101°41′35″E

Church of the Holy Rosary
- Gereja Katholik Holy Rosary
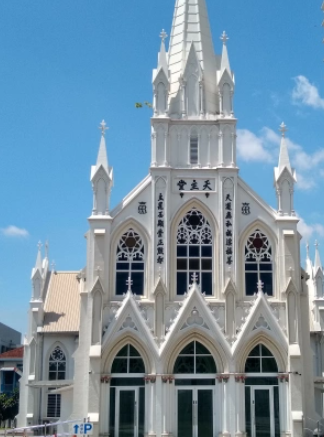
- Church of the Holy Rosary, Kuala Lumpur
- Church of the Holy Rosary
- Address: 10, Jalan Tun Sambanthan, 50470, Kuala Lumpur
- Denomination: Catholic
- Website: https://www.hrckl.com/

History
- Founder: Fr. Francis Emile Terrien

Architecture
- Architect: Fr. L. Lambert
- Architectural type: Gothic
- Completed: 1904

Administration
- Archdiocese: Kuala Lumpur

Clergy
- Archbishop: Julian Leow Beng Kim
- Priest: Rev. Fr. Dominic Tan

Church of the Holy Rosary is a Catholic church situated at Jalan Tun Sambanthan, Kuala Lumpur, and is considered one of the finest examples of neo-gothic architecture in Malaysia.

== History ==
In the early 1900s, the French missionary Father Francis Emile Terrien, who administered to the Chinese Catholic community in Kuala Lumpur, was given the task of constructing a new church for his parishioners. He raised funds from a number of sources including Chinese donors, lenders and from the nearby St. John's parish, sufficient to purchase a plot of land in Brickfields, and together with Father L. Lambert, who had trained as an architect, they began designing the new church.

Construction began in 1903 when Bishop Rene Fee, Bishop of Malacca, laid the foundation stone. After eighteen months the church was complete although at this point it lacked many of its current features including the steeple, bell tower and transepts. The parsonage was an attap building and the belfry housing the bell was placed on the ground next to the church which had a flat roof. However, the five stained-glass windows designed by Lambert, which can be seen today behind the altar, were installed at this time representing five themes of the Rosary. Bishop Monsignor Emile Barillon blessed the new church in 1904 and it was named "Church of Our Lady of the Rosary".

After the church was damaged during the Second World War, the stained glass windows having been removed for safekeeping by Father Girard, the years following the war saw an expansion in size of the congregation and the church was enlarged to accommodate the growing numbers. Supervised by Father Moses Koh to the design of architect Robert B. Pereira, two new transepts were added, the steeple was erected, a belfry was built above the entrance, and the flat roof was replaced by a sloping gabled roof. Timber supports were replaced by plaster vaulting. The new design, which we see today, was blessed at a ceremony by Bishop Olcomendy of Malacca.

During the 1960s, further expansion was carried out on the site, following fundraising by Father Edourd Giraud, with the construction of a parish hall and a presbytery. Later, Father John Hsiong carried out renovations, moved the organ and choir to the ground floor, built a raised pulpit, and removed the altar rails. In order to generate income for future maintenance of the church he opened a four-storey hostel next to the church named "Terrien House" after the founder of the church, Father Terrien. In 2003, part of the church was closed after wooden beams and louvres were found to be affected by termite infestation and were replaced, and later 22 new stained glass windows were installed.

== Architecture ==
The design of the church is based on the Gothic architectural style with characteristic lancet doors and windows with tracery and pointed arches. The shape follows the traditional cruciform plan with nave and transepts. A projecting bell tower is positioned above the entrance as part of the steeple which is surmounted by a cross finial. Mandarin characters were added in the 1950s on the facade reflecting its Chinese parishioner base.

The interior has a rib-vaulted nave with double aisles and Romanesque columns. Statues of disciples stand around the walls, and stained glass windows portray themes of the Rosary, including the oldest dating from the founding of the church behind the altar portraying: "the Annunciation", "the Nativity", "the Visitation", "the Presentation at the Temple", and "the Finding of the Child Jesus at the Temple".
