= Tun Perak Tower =

Skyscraper in Kuala Lumpur, Malaysia

- Malay: Menara Tun Perak
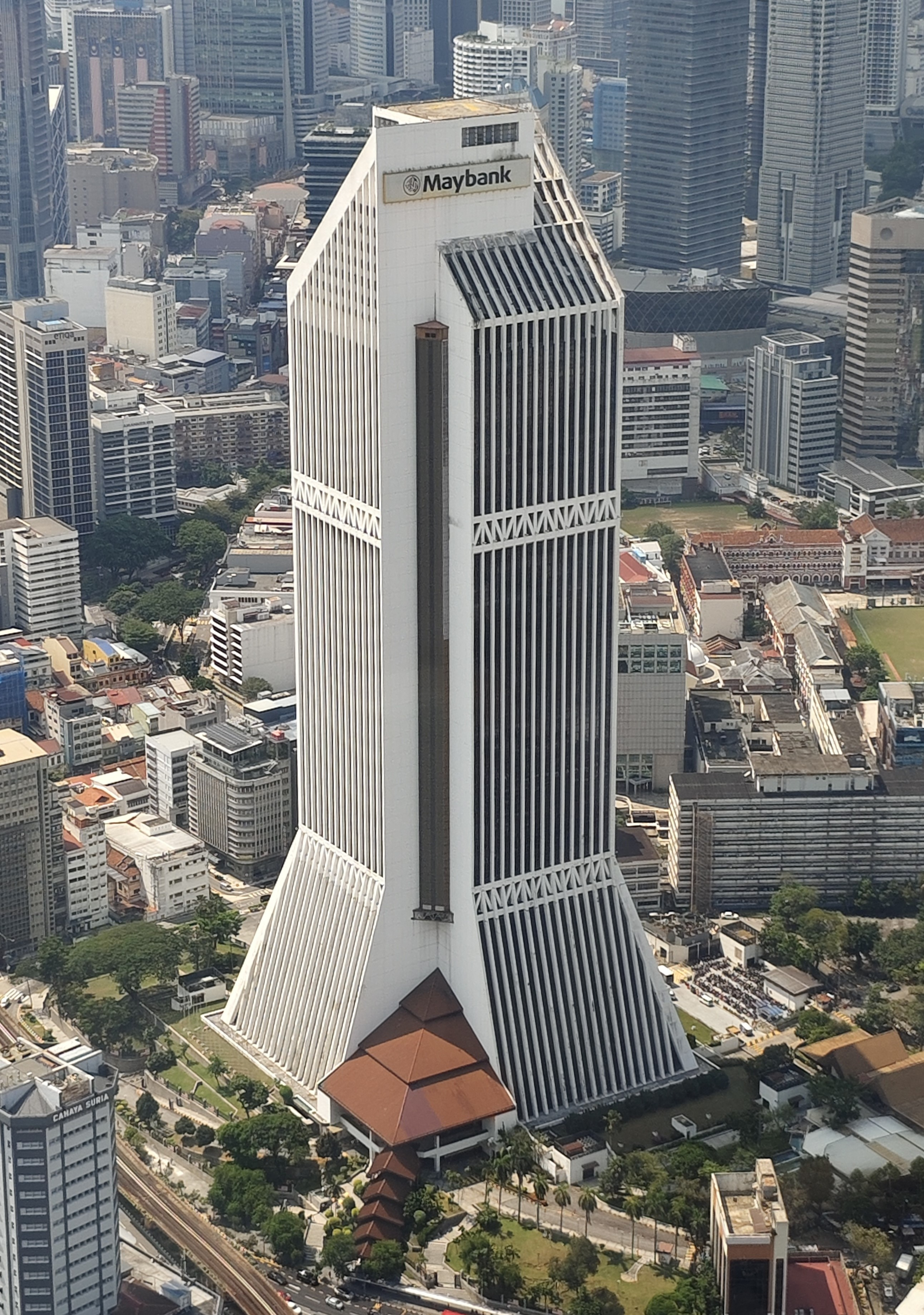
- Tun Perak Tower in 2025
- Alternative names: Maybank Tower

General information
- Status: Completed
- Type: Commercial offices
- Location: 100 Jalan Tun Perak, Pudu, Kuala Lumpur, Malaysia
- Coordinates: 3.1472°N 101.6997°E
- Named for: Tun Perak, Bendahara of Malacca Sultanate
- Construction started: 1984; 42 years ago
- Completed: 1988; 38 years ago

Height
- Architectural: 243.5 m (799 ft)

Technical details
- Floor count: 50
- Floor area: 167,300 m^{2} (1,801,000 sq ft)

Design and construction
- Architect: Hijjas Kasturi Associates
- Main contractor: Taisei Construction

The Tun Perak Tower (Malay: Menara Tun Perak), formerly known as the Maybank Tower until 2026, is a skyscraper in Pudu, Kuala Lumpur, Malaysia. The tower has served as the headquarters of Maybank before moving to the nearby Merdeka 118 building, and houses the Maybank Numismatic Museum.

== History ==
Construction of the Tun Perak Tower commenced in 1984 on Court Hill, over the site of a colonial era Sessions Court building, and was completed in 1988. Before the construction of the Petronas Twin Towers in 1995, the Tun Perak Tower was the tallest building in Kuala Lumpur as well as Malaysia, at 244 m (801 ft), around half the height of the twin skyscrapers. It remains a prominent part of the city's skyline.

== Architecture ==
Massing model showing the shape of the top of the Maybank Tower.

The floor plan of the tower consists of two square-based blocks that interlock each other at one of their corners. Each of the two block features a roof and lower base that slant at a direction opposite its other block, while the midsection stands in a perpendicular angle. The main access points of the tower are at the two corners of the structure that feature a space formed from the combination of the structure's two blocks, covered by tiered triangular roofs.

The architecture takes inspiration from the shape of an upward-pointing sheathed kris, and becomes among the iconic modern Malaysian architecture incorporating traditional elements. Its appearance also inspired the building Jadyn's Tower in SimCity 3000 Unlimited, although altered slightly in height.

== Transportation ==
The tower is accessible within walking distance north of Plaza Rakyat LRT station (which is an interchange with Merdeka MRT station) or southwest of Masjid Jamek LRT station of Rapid Rail. A major bus hub is located across Jalan Tun Perak from the tower.

== See also ==
- List of tallest buildings in Kuala Lumpur
