= Telekom Tower =

Supertall skyscraper in Kuala Lumpur, Malaysia

Coordinates: 3°06′57″N 101°39′58″E

- Menara Telekom
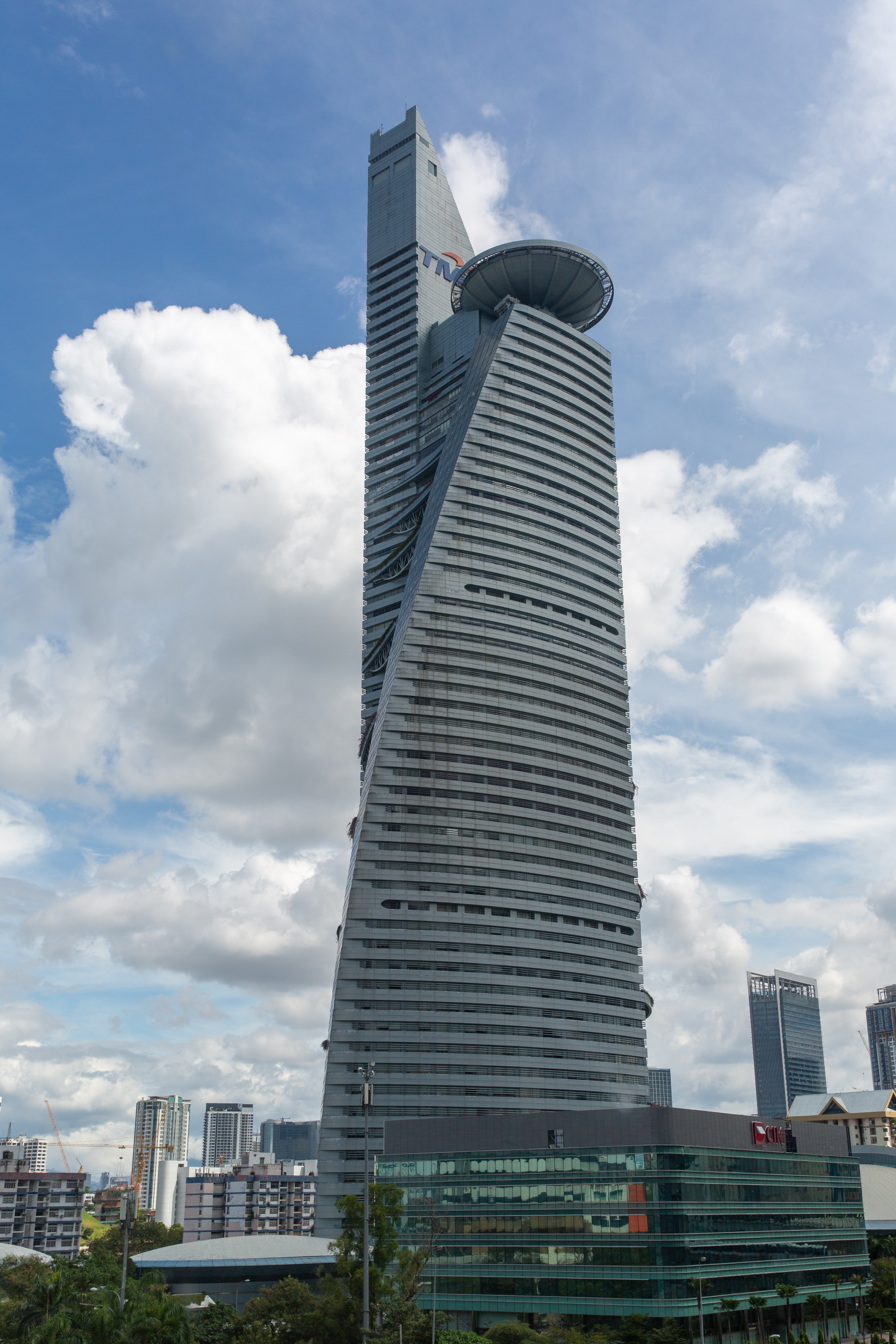
- Telekom Tower in 2019

General information
- Status: Completed
- Type: Office
- Location: Kuala Lumpur, Malaysia
- Construction started: 1998
- Completed: 2001

Height
- Tip: 311.1 m (1,021 ft)
- Roof: 310 m (1,020 ft)
- Top floor: 243 m (797 ft)

Technical details
- Floor count: 55
- Floor area: 1,600,000 ft^{2} (150,000 m^{2})

Design and construction
- Architect: Hijjas Kasturi Associates

Telekom Tower (Malay: Menara Telekom), also known as TM Tower, is a 55-storey, 310-meter-tall supertall skyscraper in Lembah Pantai in western Kuala Lumpur, Malaysia. Until 2023 it was the headquarters of Malaysian telecommunications company Telekom Malaysia.

It is the world's fourth-tallest twisted building. It is Malaysia's fifth-tallest building, and is shaped to represent a sprouting "bamboo shoot". It is regarded as the first twisted skyscraper in the world. It was designed by Hijjas Kasturi Associates and was constructed between 1998 and 2001 by Daewoo Construction. The building was officially opened on 11 February 2003 by the fourth Malaysian Prime Minister, Tun Dr. Mahathir Mohamad. It resembles the Bitexco Financial Tower (finished in 2010) in Ho Chi Minh City, and the Telecommunications Tower (finished in 2002) in Montevideo.

With a series of hanging gardens climbing it, the structure cost over $160 million. The tower has been designed to benefit from its surrounding environment, using its windows, orientation, and air condition system to encourage energy saving.

The complex also includes a 2,500-capacity theatre, a large prayer hall (surau) and a sports facility. A unique feature of the tower is its 22 open sky gardens alternating every three floors. The office floors are separated into north and south wings served by express double-deck elevators.

Near the building is Kerinchi Pylon, the tallest electricity pylon in Southeast Asia.

== Tenants ==
Menara Telekom houses several well-known tenants, namely Mercedes-Benz, BASF, DHL, Hapag-Lloyd, Unilever, Henkel Malaysia, Malaysia Airlines, Takaful Nasional and the IT Department of Tenaga Nasional.

== Avengers promotion ==
The building resembles Stark Tower (later Avengers Tower) as depicted in the Marvel Cinematic Universe films, starting with The Avengers. As part of the collaboration between TM and Marvel Malaysia in a tie-in for Avengers: Infinity War, the Avengers logo was projected on the Telekom Tower.

== Access ==
=== Public transportation ===
TM Tower is within walking distance from Kerinchi LRT station on the Kelana Jaya line.

=== Car ===
TM Tower is located along the Kuala Lumpur-Klang Highway. The Sprint toll road empties into the Federal Highway nearby.

== See also ==
- Bitexco Financial Tower
- List of skyscrapers
- List of tallest buildings in Malaysia
- List of twisted buildings
