= List of tallest buildings in Kuala Lumpur =

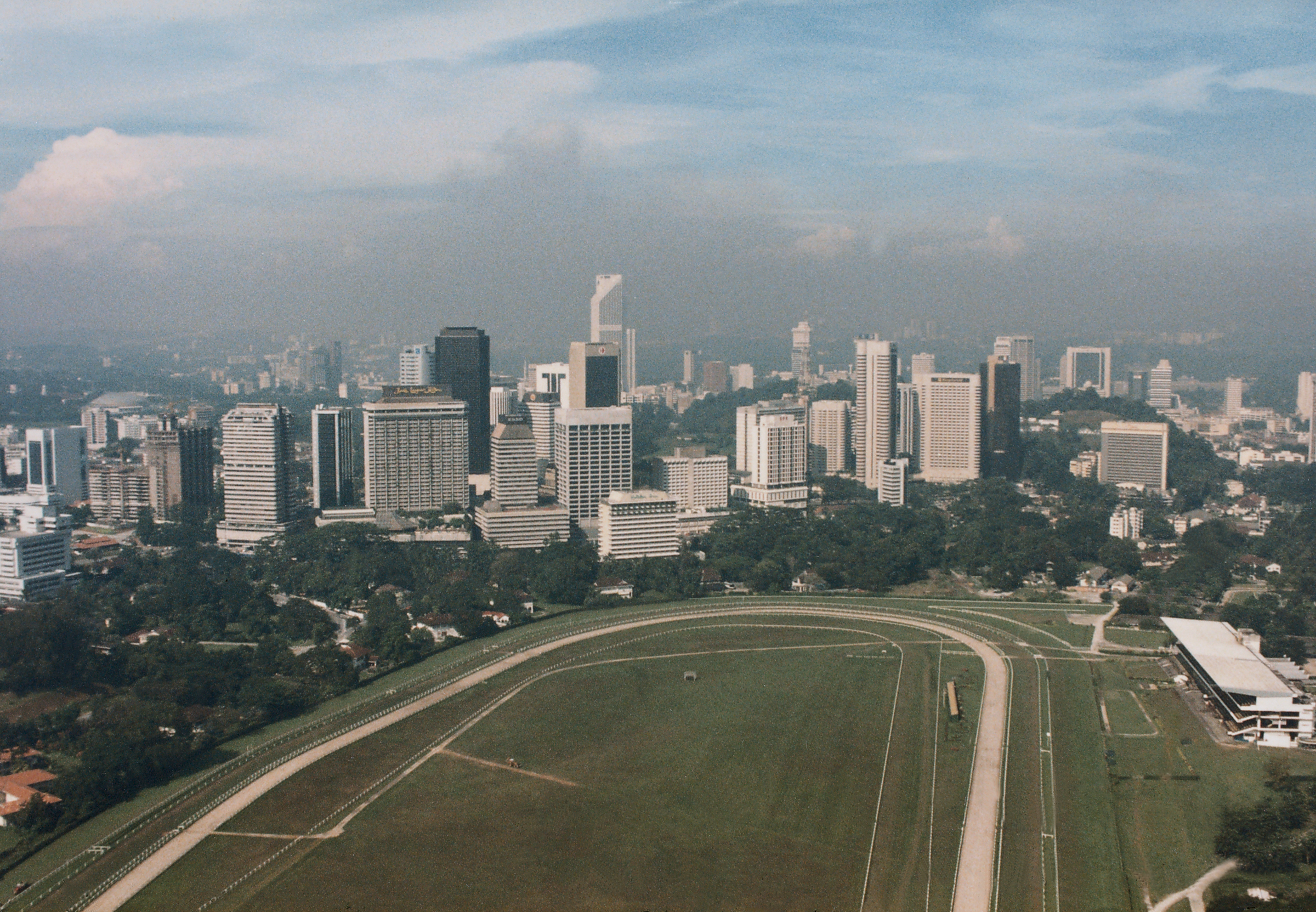
Kuala Lumpur skyscrapers in 1980s before the existence of KLCC

According to the Council on Tall Buildings and Urban Habitat (CTBUH) as of 2024, Kuala Lumpur has 193 skyscrapers exceeding 150 m (492 ft) in height, the most in Malaysia. 72 of these buildings stand taller than 200 m (656 ft) and another six exceed 300 m (984 ft) in height. The majority of them are located in the Kuala Lumpur City Centre (KLCC), Golden Triangle, Mont' Kiara and Old Downtown. The tallest building in Kuala Lumpur is Merdeka 118, which has 118 floors and stands 678.9 m (2,227 ft) in height.

The history of skyscrapers in Kuala Lumpur began with the completion of the 73 m (239 ft) 18-storey, Lee Yan Lian Building in 1945. Though not the city's first high-rise, it was the first building to surpass the 41 m (135 ft) spire of the Sultan Abdul Samad Building, which was built from 1894 to 1897. The Lee Yan Lian Building stood as the tallest in the city until it was in turn surpassed by the completion of the 77 m (253 ft) 20-storey Malaysian Houses of Parliament, which opened in 1963.

Kuala Lumpur went through a major building boom in the 1970s and 1980s that resulted from the city's rapid industrialisation. This period saw the construction of the Takaful Tower (formerly known as UMBC Building and then the Sime Bank Building), which was completed in 1971 and stands at 110 m (361 ft), making it Malaysia's first building over 100 m (328 ft). The first true skyscraper in Kuala Lumpur was Menara Bumiputera (today known as Menara Bank Muamalat), which was completed in 1978 and stands at 150.5 m (494 ft). Maybank Tower, standing at 243.5 m (799 ft), held the record of being the tallest building in Kuala Lumpur and Malaysia for nearly 10 years. The 50-storey skyscraper holds the distinction of being the first building over 200 m (656 ft) in Kuala Lumpur and at the time of its completion in 1987, the building was the third-tallest building in Asia and the world outside of North America, after the Overseas Union Bank Centre in Singapore and the 63 Building in Seoul, South Korea. Kuala Lumpur's skyscraper-building boom continued during the 1990s and 2000s, many of them residential towers. Since 2000, there has been a sharp increase in the number of skyscrapers under construction in the city area, particularly in the KLCC, Mont' Kiara and Bukit Bintang. There are also several new skyscrapers under development in the Tun Razak Exchange and Tradewinds Square Complex districts.

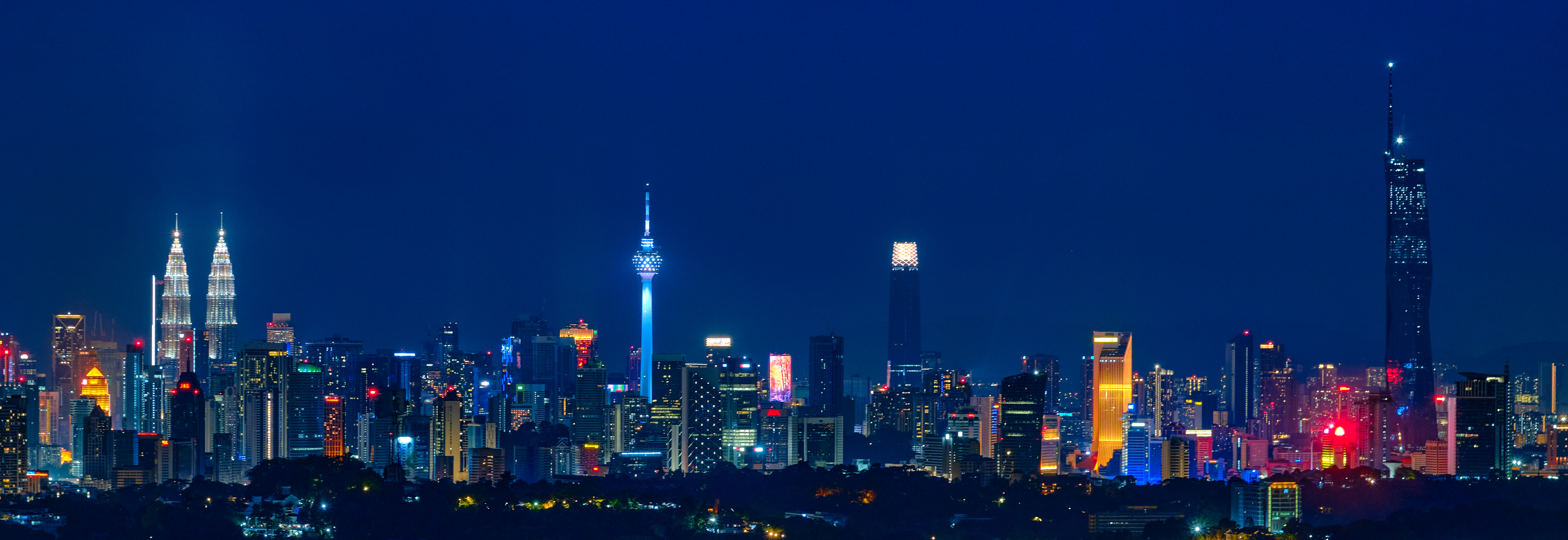
Night panorama of Kuala Lumpur in 2022

== Tallest buildings ==
This lists ranks Kuala Lumpur's skyscrapers that stand at least 150 m (492 ft) tall, based on standard height measurement. This includes spires and architectural details but does not include antenna masts. An equal sign (=) following a rank indicates the same height between two or more buildings. An asterisk (*) indicates that the building is still under construction, but has been topped out. The "Year" column indicates the year in which a building was completed.

Present tallest building in Kuala Lumpur and Malaysia
Was the tallest building in Kuala Lumpur and Malaysia upon completion

Rank	Building	Image	Height m (ft)	Floors	Year	Township	Coordinates	Notes
1	Merdeka 118		678.9 (2,227)	118	2023	Old Downtown; Pudu	3.141335°N 101.700659°E	Second-tallest skyscraper in the world; tallest building in Malaysia since 2023; first megatall skyscraper in Southeast Asia. Formerly known as the Heritage of Independence (Malay: Warisan Merdeka) and later, the PNB 118. The upper 17-storeys are occupied by the Park Hyatt Hotel Kuala Lumpur. Official height announced on 30 November 2021.
2	The Exchange 106		453.6 (1,488)	95	2019	Imbi	3°08′35.4″N 101°43′07.2″E	
3=	Petronas Tower 1		451.9 (1,483)	88	1998	KLCC	3.15800°N 101.71180°E	Tallest twin buildings in the world. Formerly the world's tallest buildings from 1998 to 2004 and Malaysia's tallest from 1998 to 2023. Currently tied as the 19st-tallest buildings in the world. First buildings built outside the United States to achieve the title of tallest in the world.
3=	Petronas Tower 2		451.9 (1,483)	88	1998	KLCC	3.15800°N 101.71180°E	Tallest twin buildings in the world. Formerly the world's tallest buildings from 1998 to 2004 and Malaysia's tallest from 1998 to 2023. Currently tied as the 19st-tallest buildings in the world. First buildings built outside the United States to achieve the title of tallest in the world.
5	Four Seasons Place Kuala Lumpur		343 (1,125)	74	2018	KLCC	3°09′29.2″N 101°42′49.7″E	World's tallest Four Seasons Hotel
6	Menara Telekom		310 (1,017)	55	2001	Bangsar South	3°06′57.9″N 101°39′56.7″E	Also known as TM Tower
7	Ilham Tower		274 (899)	58	2015	KLCC	3°09′31.7″N 101°43′07.6″E	Also known as Ilham Baru Tower/IB Tower
8	Petronas Tower 3		267 (876)	60	2012	KLCC	3°09′23.6″N 101°42′41″E	Also known as Carigali Tower
9=	Star Residences 2		265 (869)	58	2019	Golden Triangle	3°09′39.0″N 101°42′46.5″E	As of 2024, tallest residential buildings in Malaysia
9=	Star Residences 3		265 (869)	58	2019	Golden Triangle	3°09′39.6″N 101°42′43.0″E	As of 2024, tallest residential buildings in Malaysia
11	Star Residences 1		251 (823)	57	2019	Golden Triangle	3°09′40.7″N 101°42′45.2″E	As of 2024, tallest residential buildings in Malaysia
12	Menara Maybank		244 (801)	50	1988	Old Downtown; Pudu	3°08′50.3″N 101°41′58.3″E	Tallest building in Kuala Lumpur built in the 1980s, and also the titleholder from 1988 to 1998
13=	The Vogue Suites One		243 (797)	63	2017	KL Eco City	3°09′26.0″N 101°42′18.6″E	
13=	MidValley Tower of Light		243 (797)	56	2018	Mid Valley City	3°06′57.5″N 101°40′31.6″E	
15	Banyan Tree Signature		240 (797)	55	2016	Golden Triangle	3°09′01.8″N 101°42′49.5″E	Also known as Conlay Tower
16	Vista Tower		238 (781)	62	1994	Kg. Datuk Keramat	3°09′43.3″N 101°43′11.9″E	Formerly known as Empire Tower
17=	Vortex Tower		235 (771)	58	2016	Golden Triangle	3°09′16.6″N 101°42′26.3″E	
17=	Tropicana The Residence & WKL Hotel		235 (771)	55	2017	Golden Triangle	3°09′30.5″N 101°42′33.9″E	
19	Affin Bank TRX		233 (764)	47	2021	Imbi	3°08′30″N 101°43′08″E	
20=	Elite Pavilion Tower		230 (755)	50	2017	Bukit Bintang	3°08′53.3″N 101°42′45.5″E	
20=	Sky Suites @ KLCC B		230 (755)	62	2019	Golden Triangle	3°09′22.6″N 101°42′33.4″E	
22	Equatorial Plaza		229.7 (754)	55	2018	Golden Triangle	3°09′10.6″N 101°42′34.4″E	
23	Arte Plus A		227.2 (745)	56	2018	Ampang	3°09′40.1″N 101°44′51.1″E	
24	Sky Suites @ KLCC A		216.5 (710)	61	2019	Golden Triangle	3°09′22.6″N 101°42′33.4″E	
25=	Felda Tower		216 (709)	50	2012	KLCC	3°09′19.6″N 101°43′07.5″E	
25=	Naza Tower 1		216 (709)	50	2015	KLCC	3°09′16.6″N 101°43′07.0″E	
27	Sky Suites @ KLCC C		212.3 (697)	61	2019	Golden Triangle	3°09′22.6″N 101°42′33.4″E	
28	Menara Maxis		212 (696)	49	1998	KLCC	3°09′29.3″N 101°42′46.8″E	
29=	Sentral Residences A		210.4 (690)	58	2017	Brickfields	3°08′12.9″N 101°41′23.7″E	
29=	Sentral Residences B		210.4 (690)	58	2017	Brickfields	3°08′12.9″N 101°41′23.7″E	
31	AmBank Tower		210 (689)	50	1998	Kg. Baru	3°09′40.6″N 101°42′39.5″E	
32	Pavilion Ceylon Hill Residence		210 (689)	52	2023	Ceylon Hill	3°08′40.92″N 101°42′2.519″E	
33	TSLAW Tower		209 (686)	48	2021	Imbi	3°08′38″N 101°43′10″E	
34	THE FACE Platinum Suites		207 (679)	51	2015	Kg. Baru	3°09′30.9″N 101°42′14.0″E	
35=	The St. Regis Kuala Lumpur		205 (673)	48	2016	Brickfields	3°08′12.9″N 101°41′19.1″E	
35=	Q Sentral Tower A		205 (673)	48	2014	Brickfields	3°08′11.6″N 101°41′14.7″E	
35=	Q Sentral Tower B		205 (673)	48	2014	Brickfields	3°08′11.6″N 101°41′14.7″E	
38	The Troika Tower 3		204 (669)	50	2010	KLCC	3°09′29.4″N 101°43′04.3″E	
39=	Berjaya Times Square Tower A		203 (666)	48	2003	Imbi	3°08′33.2″N 101°42′39.9″E	
39=	Berjaya times Square Tower B		203 (666)	48	2003	Imbi	3°08′31.9″N 101°42′34.7″E	
41	Arte Plus B		202.8 (665)	50	2018	Ampang	3°09′41.7″N 101°44′51.4″E	
42=	K Residence		202 (663)	52	2008	Golden Triangle	3°09′34.3″N 101°42′47.6″E	
42=	Le Nouvel Tower 1		202 (663)	49	2016	Golden Triangle	3°09′34.0″N 101°42′44.8″E	
44=	South View Serviced Apartments 1		201.5 (661)	49	2017	Bangsar South	3°06′50.7″N 101°39′52.2″E	
44=	South View Serviced Apartments 2		201.5 (661)	49	2017	Bangsar South	3°06′50.7″N 101°39′52.2″E	
46	Lot G Office 1		200 (656)	49	2013	Brickfields	3°07′56.7″N 101°41′10.4″E	
47	Menara Multi Purpose		198.2 (650)	40	1994	Old Downtown; Dang Wangi	3°09′18.4″N 101°41′57.8″E	Also known as Menara Multi Purpose and Capsquare 1
48	Capital Square		198 (650)	41	2011	Old Downtown; Dang Wangi	3°09′15.2″N 101°41′55.8″E	Also known as Capsquare 2
49	Maju Perdana 1		196 (643)	50	2002	Old Downtown; Medan Tuanku	3°09′35.6″N 101°41′46.2″E	Also known as Plaza Potential
50	Standard Chartered Tower		193 (633)	43	1990	Bukit Bintang	3°08′58.8″N 101°42′40.7″E	Formerly known as Prime Tower, Shahzan Insas Tower, Shahzan Prudential Tower
51	Mercu 2 @ KL Eco City		190.7 (625)	47	2018	KL Eco City	3°07′07.0″N 101°40′25.5″E	Also known as Setia Tower
52	Citibank Tower		190.2 (624)	50	1995	KLCC	3°09′36.3″N 101°43′02.7″E	Formerly known as Lion Tower
53=	Bangkok Bank Tower @ Berjaya Central Park		187 (624)	46	2015	Golden Triangle	3°09′22.6″N 101°42′18.8″E	
53=	The Ritz-Carlton Residences @ Berjaya Central Park		187 (624)	46	2015	Golden Triangle	3°09′24.0″N 101°42′20.6″E	
55	The Westside 3		186.6 (612)	46	2018	Bandar Menjalara	3°11′02.6″N 101°37′27.4″E	
56	Marinara Financial Center		185.7 (609)	36	2000	Semarak	3°10′06.2″N 101°42′46.5″E	
57	Grand Seasons Hotel		184 (604)	46	1998	Titiwangsa	3°10′11.2″N 101°41′52.8″E	
58=	Park Hill Residence A		182.6 (597)	45	2018	Bukit Jalil	3°03′18.8″N 101°41′45.3″E	
58=	Park Hill Residence B		182.6 (597)	45	2018	Bukit Jalil	3°03′22.3″N 101°41′44.9″E	
60	Public Mutual Tower		179 (587)	42	2016	Golden Triangle	3°09′03.9″N 101°42′26.5″E	
61=	The Henge Kepong A		178.5 (585)	45	2018	Kepong	3°13′14.8″N 101°38′27.9″E	
61=	The Henge Kepong B		178.5 (585)	45	2018	Kepong	3°13′16.3″N 101°38′28.9″E	
61=	The Henge Kepong C		178.5 (585)	45	2018	Kepong	3°13′18.1″N 101°38′30.2″E	
61=	The Henge Kepong D		178.5 (585)	45	2018	Kepong	3°13′14.8″N 101°38′30.5″E	
65=	Arte Plus C		178 (584)	44	2018	Ampang	3°09′39.3″N 101°44′49.6″E	
65=	The Establishment		178 (584)	41	2017	Brickfields	3°07′40.7″N 101°40′49.3″E	
65=	MK 10 Tower A		178 (584)	43	2010	Mont' Kiara	3°10′09.7″N 101°39′20.8″E	
65=	MK 10 Tower B		178 (584)	43	2010	Mont' Kiara	3°10′12.4″N 101°39′20.2″E	
65=	Crest Tower 2		178 (584)	44	2014	Kg. Baru	3°09′31.9″N 101°42′19.6″E	
70	The Troika Tower 2		177 (581)	44	2010	KLCC	3°09′30.1″N 101°43′05.1″E	
71	LaVile Kuala Lumpur (Residensi LaVile)		176 (578)	49	2022	Lorong Peel; Maluri	3°07′39.8″N 101°43′41.0″E	
72	Menara Dato'Onn		175 (574)	40	1985	Old Downtown; Chow Kit	3°10′09.5″N 101°41′27.2″E	
73	KKR2 Tower		174.4 (572)	37	2014	Federal Hill	3°09′10.1″N 101°41′28.6″E	
74=	Le Nouvel Tower 2		174 (570)	43	2016	Golden Triangle	3°09′33.8″N 101°42′44.5″E	
74=	Grand Hyatt Kuala Lumpur		174 (570)	43	2012	KLCC	3°09′13.1″N 101°42′44.1″E	
74=	One Central Park		174 (570)	45	2016	Bandar Menjalara	3°11′12.3″N 101°37′32.7″E	
77=	MK 11 Tower A		172.5 (566)	43	2011	Mont' Kiara	3°10′08.7″N 101°39′19.6″E	
77=	MK 11 Tower B		172.5 (566)	43	2011	Mont' Kiara	3°10′06.9″N 101°39′19.9″E	
77=	MK 11 Tower C		172.5 (566)	43	2011	Mont' Kiara	3°10′05.9″N 101°39′17.5″E	
77=	MK 11 Tower D		172.5 (566)	43	2011	Mont' Kiara	3°10′07.4″N 101°39′16.4″E	
77=	MK 11 Tower E		172.5 (566)	43	2011	Mont' Kiara	3°10′08.7″N 101°39′17.0″E	
82=	Seni Mont' Kiara A		172 (564)	43	2011	Mont' Kiara	3°10′12.7″N 101°39′33.0″E	
82=	Seni Mont' Kiara B		172 (564)	43	2011	Mont' Kiara	3°10′16.8″N 101°39′32.9″E	
84	Mont' Kiara Bayu		171.4 (562)	42	2002	Mont' Kiara	3°10′21.9″N 101°39′13.0″E	
85	Menara PNB		171 (561)	45	1985	Golden Triangle	3°09′27.2″N 101°43′13.4″E	
86=	Verticas Residensi A		170.5 (559)	43	2013	Bukit Ceylon	3°08′51.5″N 101°42′17.0″E	
86=	Verticas Residensi B		170.5 (559)	43	2013	Bukit Ceylon	3°08′51.3″N 101°42′15.5″E	
86=	Verticas Residensi C		170.5 (559)	43	2013	Bukit Ceylon	3°08′51.9″N 101°42′15.0″E	
89=	Public Bank Tower		170 (558)	36	1994	Kg. Baru	3°09′35.3″N 101°42′36.7″E	
89=	9 Seputeh A		170 (558)	44	2019	Taman Desa	3°06′17.8″N 101°40′34.8″E	
89=	9 Seputeh C		170 (558)	44	2019	Taman Desa	3°06′21.8″N 101°40′36.1″E	
89=	Lakeville Residences Tower B		170 (558)	41	2018	Taman Wahyu	3°12′31.8″N 101°40′03.4″E	
89=	Lakeville Residences Tower C		170 (558)	41	2018	Taman Wahyu	3°12′34.2″N 101°40′02.8″E	
89=	Lakeville Residences Tower D		170 (558)	41	2019	Taman Wahyu	3°12′35.9″N 101°40′02.7″E	
89=	Lakeville Residences Tower E		170 (558)	41	2019	Taman Wahyu	3°12′37.1″N 101°40′03.0″E	
96=	KL Gateway Corporate Office Tower 1		169.5 (556)	42	2017	Bangsar South	3°06′50.7″N 101°39′45.6″E	
96=	KL Gateway Corporate Office Tower 2		169.5 (556)	38	2017	Bangsar South	3°06′50.8″N 101°39′47.0″E	
96=	The Elements @ Ampang 1		169 (554)	42	2014	Ampang	3°09′41.1″N 101°44′53.7″E	
96=	The Elements @ Ampang 2		169 (554)	42	2014	Ampang	3°09′38.7″N 101°44′51.9″E	
100	Wisma Goldhill		168.1 (552)	37	1993	Bukit Ceylon	3°09′01.1″N 101°42′30.5″E	
101=	Glomac Tower		168 (551)	40	2011	Golden Triangle	3°09′21.4″N 101°42′35.2″E	Also known as Prestige Tower
101=	CAHB Corporate Office Tower		168 (551)	42	2008	Old Downtown; Dang Wangi	3°09′18.7″N 101°41′41.8″E	Also known as Bumiputra-Commerce Tower
101=	Plaza Cygal		168 (551)	40	2000	Bangsar South	3°06′57.1″N 101°39′47.6″E	
104	PV21 Platinum Lake Condominium Tower A		167 (548)	42	2017	Setapak	3°11′58.8″N 101°43′10.0″E	
105=	Desa Green Serviced Apartments 1		166.4 (546)	40	2016	Taman Desa	3°06′19.4″N 101°41′42.9″E	
105=	Desa Green Serviced Apartments 2		166.4 (546)	40	2016	Taman Desa	3°06′20.6″N 101°41′41.1″E	
105=	Desa Green Serviced Apartments 3		166.4 (546)	40	2016	Taman Desa	3°06′18.5″N 101°41′40.4″E	
108=	MK28 Tower 1		166.3 (545)	40	2013	Mont' Kiara	3°10′24.5″N 101°39′08.9″E	
108=	MK28 Tower 2		166.3 (545)	40	2013	Mont' Kiara	3°10′24.7″N 101°39′05.4″E	
110=	The Oval West Tower		166 (544)	41	2009	KLCC	3°09′22.1″N 101°43′06.8″E	
110=	The Oval East Tower		166 (544)	41	2009	KLCC	3°09′22.4″N 101°43′09.1″E	
112	The Westside 2		165 (541)	41	2015	Bandar Menjalara	3°11′03.8″N 101°37′23.7″E	
113	CIMB Headquarters		162.3 (532)	40	2012	Brickfields	3°08′11.3″N 101°41′11.1″E	
114=	EcoSky by Eco World A		162.2 (532)	40	2018	Taman Wahyu	3°13′05.6″N 101°40′13.5″E	
114=	EcoSky by Eco World B		162.2 (532)	40	2018	Taman Wahyu	3°13′08.4″N 101°40′12.7″E	
114=	EcoSky by Eco World C		162.2 (532)	40	2018	Taman Wahyu	3°13′11.7″N 101°40′14.7″E	
117=	Celeste @ Setia Sky Residences		162 (531)	40	2016	Titiwangsa	3°10′06.0″N 101°42′39.3″E	
117=	Divina @ Setia Sky Residences		162 (531)	40	2014	Titiwangsa	3°10′06.2″N 101°42′37.4″E	
117=	Boheme @ Setia Sky Residences		162 (531)	40	2013	Titiwangsa	3°10′06.6″N 101°42′35.3″E	
117=	Alia @ Setia Sky Residences		162 (531)	40	2013	Titiwangsa	3°10′05.8″N 101°42′33.6″E	
117=	Menara Keck Seng		162 (531)	39	1997	Bukit Bintang	3°08′52.7″N 101°42′54.2″E	
122=	The Vertical Corporate Tower 1		161.4 (529)	40	2016	Bangsar South	3°06′40.7″N 101°39′57.6″E	
122=	The Vertical Corporate Tower		161.4 (529)	40	2016	Bangsar South	3°06′42.7″N 101°39′57.9″E	
124	JKG Tower		161.2 (529)	31	2016	Old Downtown; Chow Kit	3°09′41.4″N 101°41′44.5″E	
125	The Vertical Business Suites Tower A		161.1 (528)	40	2015	Bangsar South	3°06′38.2″N 101°39′55.7″E	
126=	The Reach Tower 1		161 (528)	41	2017	Setapak	3°09′41.4″N 101°41′44.5″E	
126=	Mercu Zikay		161 (528)	40	2017	Kg. Baru	3°09′48.1″N 101°42′09.9″E	
126=	Nadi Bangsar		161 (528)	40	2017	Bangsar	3°07′33.4″N 101°40′31.4″E	
129=	PV21 Platinum Lake Condominium Tower B		160 (525)	40	2017	Setapak	3°11′59.9″N 101°43′11.7″E	
129=	The Troika Tower 1		160 (525)	38	2010	KLCC	3°09′28.5″N 101°43′04.6″E	
131	Angkupuri		158.2 (519)	39	1999	Mont' Kiara	3°10′12.8″N 101°39′07.7″E	
132	The Vertical Business Suites Tower B		158.1 (518)	38	2015	Bangsar South	3°06′37.6″N 101°39′58.0″E	
133	Dayabumi Complex		157 (515)	38	1984	Merdeka Square	3°08′41.8″N 101°41′37.7″E	
134	One KL		155 (508)	35	2009	KLCC	3°09′21.3″N 101°42′38.4″E	
135	Dynasty Hotel		154.5 (507)	37	1994	Sentul	3°10′19.3″N 101°41′31.3″E	
136=	Pavilion Residences Tower 1		154 (505)	47	2009	Bukit Bintang	3°08′57.5″N 101°42′50.5″E	
136=	Hilton Kuala Lumpur		154 (505)	37	2004	Brickfields	3°08′06.4″N 101°41′08.7″E	
136=	Le Méridien Kuala Lumpur		154 (505)	37	2004	Brickfields	3°08′07.7″N 101°41′10.9″E	
136=	Dion Tower		154 (505)	37	1997	Golden Triangle	3°09′06.6″N 101°42′34.8″E	Also known as Menara Dion
140=	Sheraton Imperial Hotel		152 (499)	38	1997	Old Downtown; Medan Tuanku	3°09′31.8″N 101°42′00.2″E	
140=	Menara KH		152 (499)	36	1983	Golden Triangle	3°09′04.4″N 101°42′35.7″E	Formerly known as Promet Tower
142	Tabung Haji Building		151.8 (498)	38	1984	Golden Triangle	3°09′29.9″N 101°43′12.3″E	
143=	Mont' Kiara Damai		151 (495)	43	2004	Mont' Kiara	3°10′16.4″N 101°39′21.8″E	
143=	Parkview Serviced Apartments		151 (495)	43	2007	Golden Triangle	3°09′21.1″N 101°42′29.4″E	
143=	Menara TA One		151 (495)	37	1996	Golden Triangle	3°09′24.4″N 101°42′34.9″E	Also known as Menara Budaya
143=	Malaysia Airlines Building		151 (495)	36	1985	Golden Triangle	3°09′07.3″N 101°42′32.7″E	
143=	Menara Binjai		151 (495)	34	2012	KLCC	3°09′34.0″N 101°43′07.2″E	
148	Bangunan Dewan Bandaraya		150.9 (495)	35	1980	Old Downtown; Chow Kit	3°09′07.7″N 101°41′38.7″E	Also known as Menara DBKL 1
149=	The Robertson North Suites		150.7 (494)	42	2017	Old Downtown; Pudu	3°08′39.1″N 101°42′15.7″E	
149=	PP1M Bukit Jalil		150.7 (494)	42	2017	Old Downtown; Bukit Jalil, Kuala Lumpur	3°08′39.1″N 101°42′15.7″E	
149=	The Robertson South Suites		150.7 (494)	42	2017	Old Downtown; Pudu	3°08′37.7″N 101°42′15.0″E	
151	Menara Bank Muamalat		150.5 (493)	34	1978	Old Downtown; Dang Wangi	3°09′01.7″N 101°41′49.1″E	Formerly known as Menara Bumiputera

== Tallest under construction ==
Buildings that are under construction and have a planned height of at least 150 m (492 ft).

Rank	Building	Height (m / ft)	Floors	Notes
1	So/ Sofitel Residences 1	345 / 1,131	78	2025
2	The Landmark @ KL City Tower A	73	-	
3	Pavilion Damansara Heights Crown Residences	260 / 853	66	
4	Pavilion Damansara Heights Regent Suites	253.4 / 831	70	
5	Pavilion Damansara Heights Windsor Suites	253.4 / 831	70	
6	Isola @ KLCC	250+ / 820+	60	-
7	The Colony By Infinitum	250 / 820	56	-
8	TA3	240+ / 787+	60	-
9	TA4	240+ / 787+	60	-
10	PJ Sentral Garden City	200+ / 656+	60	-
11	UOB Tower 2	193.5 / 635	29	-

== Tallest undergoing preparations ==
Buildings that are on preparation sites or ground works and have a planned height of at least 150 m (492 ft).

Rank	Building	Height (m / ft)	Floors	Notes
1	BBCC Signature Tower	400+ / 1,312+	84	-
2	M101 The Skywheel Tower A	316 / 1,037	78	-
3	M101 The Skywheel Tower B	316 / 1,037	78	-
4	Tradewinds Square Tower B	308 / 1,011	65	-
5	Redevelopment of BB Plaza	260+ / 853+	60+	-
6	Menara Tradewinds	250+ / 820+	50	-
7	MAS Annex (PNB 1194)	250 / 820	50	-
8	The Twy Duplex Tower A	200+ / 656+	51	-
9	The Twy Duplex Tower B	200+ / 656+	51	-

== Tallest proposed ==
Buildings that are proposed and have a planned height of at least 150 m (492 ft).

Rank	Building	Height (m / ft)	Floors	Notes
1	Tradewinds Square Tower	775 / 2,543	150	Proposed
2	Tower M	700 / 2,296	145	Future project, unlikely to materialise before 2035, previously KLCC East Gate Tower, has been proposed to be the tallest building in Malaysia and Southeast Asia region once completed. Its developer was also responsible for the construction of the Petronas Twin Towers in the Kuala Lumpur City Centre.
3	Malaya 115	596.6 / 1,957	115	Would be the sixth tallest building in the world, taking the place of the Lotte World Tower in South Korea
4	Bandar Malaysia Iconic Tower	500+ / 1,640+	100+	Would be the tallest building in Bandar Malaysia project
5	CREC REgional HQ	80+	-	
6	Landmark Tower	400+ / 1,312+	100	-
7	EkoPark Place	400+ / 1,312+	80	-
8	German Embassy Land Redevelopment	300+ / 984+	79	-
9	KL PWTC Tower	300+ / 984+	70	-
10	Tan Chong Redevelopment	280 / 919	60	-
11	OSK Tower	270+ / 886+	60	Approved
12	Angkasa Raya	268 / 879	65	Approved
13	Bangsar Junction	260+ / 853+	60+	-
14	PHB Conlay Redevelopment	260+ / 853+	59	-
15	Festival Lake City	250+ / 820+	70+	-
16	Lot D1	250+ / 820+	60+	-
17	Empire City 2	250+ / 820+	60+	-
18	Lai Meng School Redevelopment Tower A	250+ / 820+	60	-
19	Lai Meng School Redevelopment Tower B	250+ / 820+	60	-
20	Concorde Hotel & Residences	250+ / 820+	55	-
21	Olympia Tower	230+ / 755+	50	-
22	RHB Carpocrate HQ	220 / 722	50	-
23	TNB Tower	210 / 689	34	-
24	Capsquare Serviced Apartment	204 / 669	52	-
25	TRION Kuala Lumpur Tower A	200+ / 656+	66	-
26	TRION Kuala Lumpur Tower B	200+ / 656+	66	-
27	Ritz Carlton Redevelopment	200+ / 656+	59	-
28	DBKL2 Tower	200+ / 656+	57	-
29	Platinum Park Residences Tower A	200+ / 656+	53	-
30	Platinum Park Residences Tower B	200+ / 656+	53	-
31	Platinum Park Residences Tower C	200+ / 656+	53	-
32	Platinum Park Residences Tower D	200+ / 656+	53	-

== Timeline of tallest buildings ==
This lists commercial buildings that once held the title of tallest building in Kuala Lumpur.

Buildings with this sign (*) indicate that they have been demolished.

Name	Image	Address	Years as Tallest	Height m (ft)	Floors	Coordinates	Notes
Sultan Abdul Samad Building		Jalan Raja	1897–1945	40 (131)	3	3°08′55.2″N 101°41′39.8″E	Formerly known simply as Government Offices in its early years
Lee Yan Lian Building		Jalan Tun Perak	1945–1959	73 (239)	18	3°08′52.4″N 101°41′52.7″E	The first high-rise building
Malaysian Houses of Parliament		Perdana Botanical Gardens	1959–1971	77 (252)	20	3°08′57.8″N 101°40′45.8″E	The first high-rise building, which was built after independence
Menara Takaful		4 Jalan Sultan Sulaiman	1971–1973	110 (361)	28	3°08′21.5″N 101°41′45.5″E	Formerly known as Bangunan UMBC. The first high-rise building over 100 m (328 ft)
Crowne Plaza Mutiara KL*		Jalan Sultan Ismail	1973–1978	130 (427)	36	3°09′05.8″N 101°42′39.3″E	Formerly known as KL Hilton. The first five-star hotel in Kuala Lumpur and Malaysia, which was officially launched on July 6, 1973. Demolished in 2013
Menara Bumiputra		21 Jalan Melaka	1978–1980	150.5 (493)	34	3°09′01.7″N 101°41′49.1″E	Also known as Menara Bank Muamalat. The first skyscraper in Malaysia
Bangunan Dewan Bandaraya		Jalan Raja Laut	1980–1983	150.9 (495)	35	3°09′07.7″N 101°41′38.7″E	Also known as Menara DBKL 1
Menara KH		Jalan Sultan Sulaiman	1983–1984	152 (499)	36	3°09′04.4″N 101°42′35.7″E	Formerly known as Promet Tower
Kompleks Dayabumi		Jalan Sultan Hishamuddin	1984–1985	157 (515)	35	3°08′41.8″N 101°41′37.7″E	
Menara Dato' Onn		45 Jalan Tun Ismail	1985–1988	175 (574)	40	3°10′09.5″N 101°41′27.2″E	
Menara Maybank		100 Jalan Tun Perak	1988–1998	244 (799)	55	3°08′50.3″N 101°41′58.3″E	The first skyscraper over 200 m (656 ft)
Petronas Twin Towers		KLCC	1998–2023	451.9 (1,483)	88	3°09′28″N 101°42′42.9″E	The tallest buildings in the world from 1998 to 2004 and the tallest twin towers in the world
Merdeka 118		Old Downtown; Pudu	2023–present	678.9 (2,227)	118	3.141335°N 101.700659°E	

== See also ==
- List of tallest buildings in the world
- List of tallest buildings in Malaysia
- List of tallest buildings in George Town
- List of tallest buildings in Johor Bahru
- List of tallest buildings in Kota Kinabalu
