= Medan Tuanku station =

Monorail station in Kuala Lumpur, Malaysia

MR9 Medan Tuanku
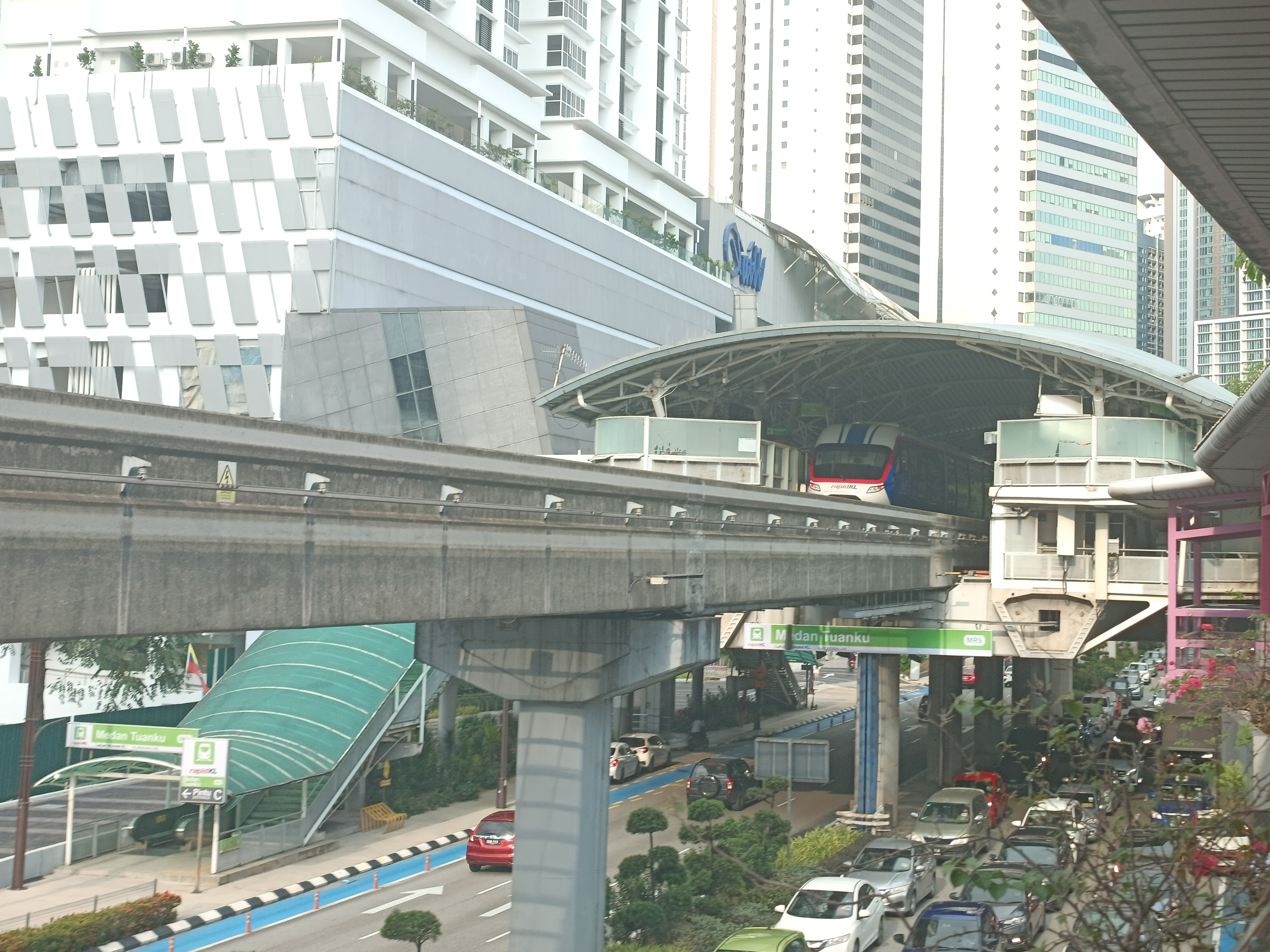
- The exterior of the Medan Tuanku station, as seen from the southwest.

General information
- Other names: Malay: ميدن توانکو (Jawi); Chinese: 美丹端姑; Tamil: மேடான் துவாங்கு
- Location: Jalan Sultan Ismail, Medan Tuanku; 50250 Kuala Lumpur; Malaysia
- Coordinates: 3°9′33″N 101°41′55″E
- System: Rapid KL
- Owner: Prasarana Malaysia
- Operator: Rapid Rail
- Line: 8 KL Monorail
- Platforms: 2 side platforms
- Tracks: 2
- Connections: Connecting station to AG5 SP5 Sultan Ismail via a 580 meters pedestrian bridge

Construction
- Structure type: Elevated
- Parking: Not available
- Cycle facilities: Not available
- Accessible: Available

Other information
- Station code: MR9

History
- Opened: 31 August 2003; 22 years ago
- Former names: Wawasan

Services
| Preceding station | | Following station |
|---|---|---|
| Bukit Nanas towards Kuala Lumpur Sentral | KL Monorail | Chow Kit towards Titiwangsa |
Location

Medan Tuanku station is a Malaysian elevated monorail train station that forms part of the Kuala Lumpur Monorail (KL Monorail) line, located in Kuala Lumpur and opened for the train service on 31 August 2003. This station was formerly called Wawasan station, after a former adjacent development project which was named “Bandar Wawasan” in the Kampung Baru area.

The station is situated above Jalan Sultan Ismail, just south of Chow Kit and located east of an intersection with Jalan Tuanku Abdul Rahman; it marks the start and end of the Monorail line that runs parallel along Jalan Sultan Ismail, until the Bukit Bintang station, after which the line turns west intoto Jalan Imbi.

The station is situated in and named after Medan Tuanku, a small district connected to Jalan Tuanku Abdul Rahman, Jalan Sultan Ismail and Jalan Dang Wangi via backroads.

== Connecting station ==
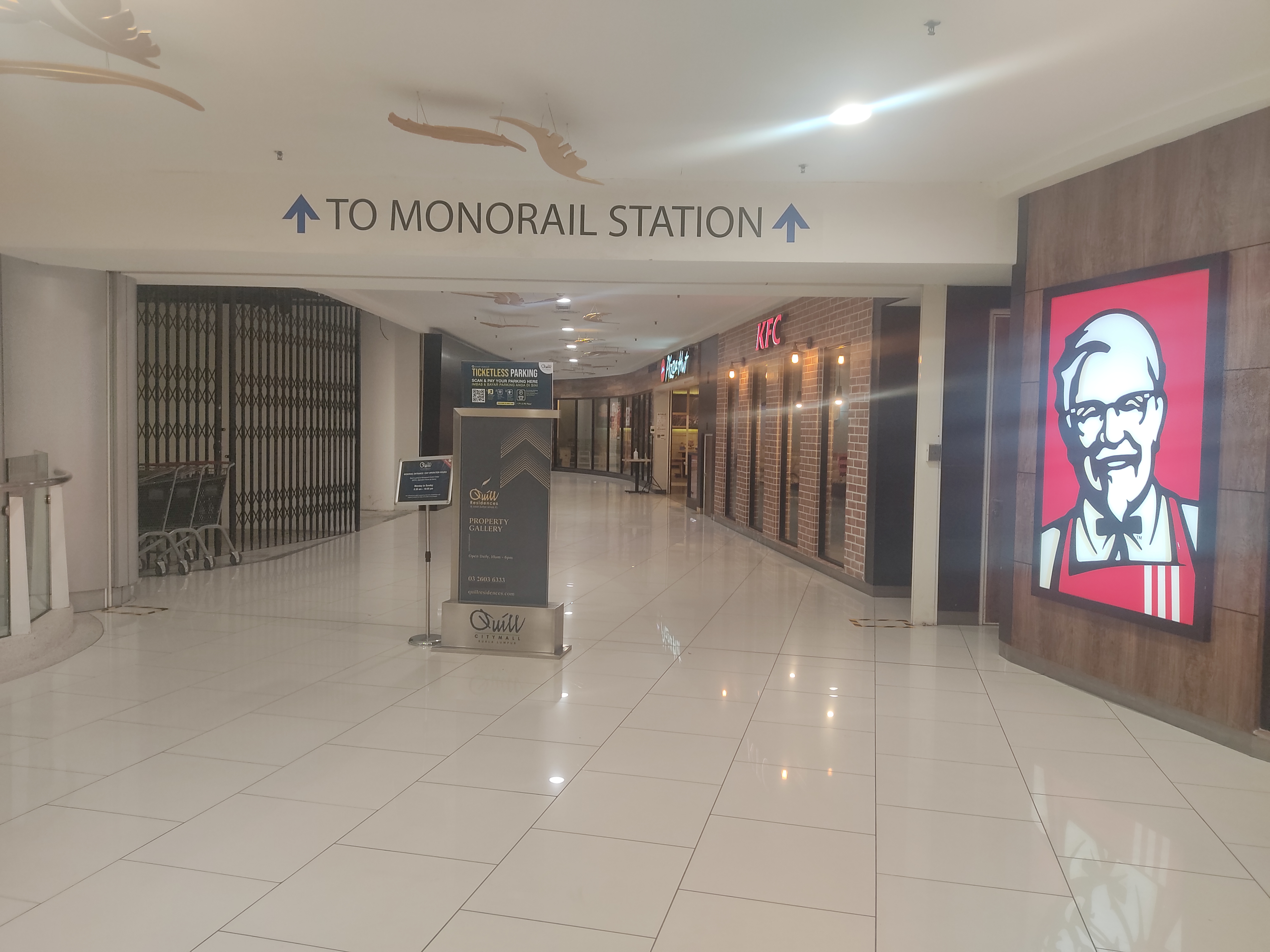
Monorail Entrance from Quill City Mall

The station is linked to the Sultan Ismail LRT station, 580 metres away, by a pedestrian bridge on the LRT Ampang Line and LRT Sri Petaling Line, and as such is designated as an official connecting station with the LRT lines. However, the two stations do not have an integrated paid-area; commuters are required to tap out and tap in or purchase a new ticket at the next station upon transferring. The Dang Wangi LRT station is also a 520-meter walk away, via Jalan Raja Abdullah, but is not designated as an official connection. The station is also linked with the Quill City Mall via entrance E. There are no bus services provided to the station.
