= Lee Yan Lian Building =

Office building in Kuala Lumpur, Malaysia

- Malay: Bangunan Lee Yan Lian; Chinese: 李延年大廈
- Interactive map of the Lee Yan Lian Building area

General information
- Type: Commercial offices
- Location: Jalan Tun Perak, Kuala Lumpur, Malaysia
- Coordinates: 3.147889°N 101.697972°E
- Completed: 1945; 81 years ago

Height
- Roof: 73 m (240 ft)

Technical details
- Floor count: 18

Design and construction
- Architect: E.H. Cook

The Lee Yan Lian Building is a high-rise building in the Kawasan Perancangan Pusat borough of Kuala Lumpur, Malaysia. The building has 18 storeys and is 73.04 m (240 ft) tall. It was completed in 1945. Prior to the completion of the Malaysian Houses of Parliament in 1963, it was the tallest building in Malaysia.

== See also ==
- List of tallest buildings in Kuala Lumpur
- List of tallest buildings in Malaysia
