= Multi Purpose Tower =

Multi-Purpose Tower Menara Multi-Purpose
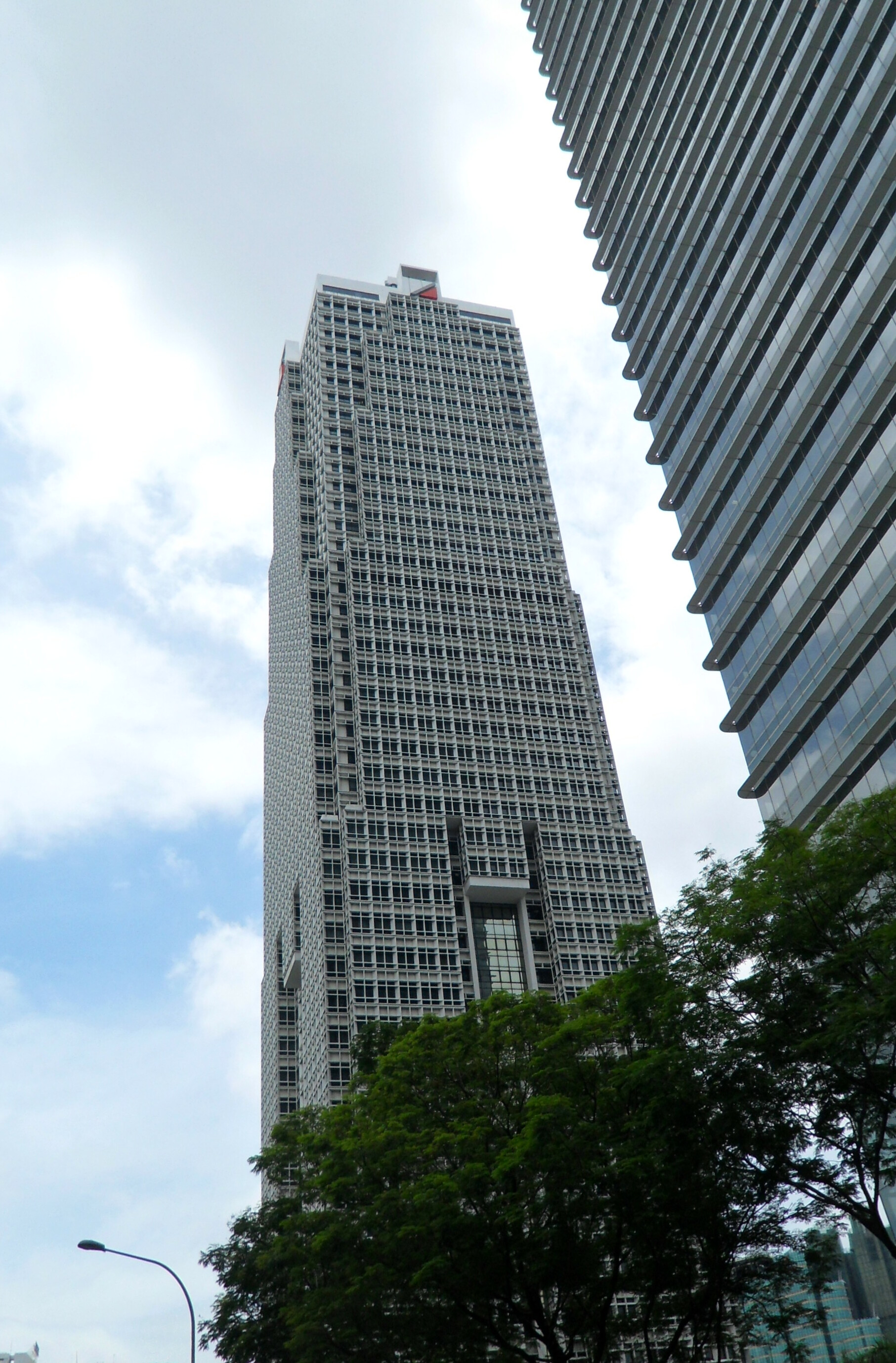
- Alternative names: Capital Square Tower 1

General information
- Type: Commercial offices
- Location: Jalan Munshi Abdullah; Kuala Lumpur, Malaysia
- Coordinates: 3.1556°N 101.6989°E
- Completed: 1994

Height
- Roof: 198.23 m (650.4 ft)
- Top floor: 171.6 m (563 ft)

Technical details
- Floor count: 40

Design and construction
- Architect: John Portman & Associates

The Multi-Purpose Tower is a Grade A skyscraper located along Jalan Munshi Abdullah in the midtown of Kuala Lumpur, Malaysia. The tower is headquarters to Multi-Purpose Holdings Berhad, Naturally Plus (Malaysia) Sdn Bhd, CBRE-WTW Sdn Bhd and Huaren Resources Sdn Bhd.

== History ==
Menara Multi-Purpose was developed by Bandar Raya Developments Berhad (BRDB) and was completed in 1994. Menara Multi Purpose was designed by John Portman & Associates and Jurubena Bertiga International. It was initially envisaged to be part of a greater Capital Square commercial development. However, the 1997 Asian financial crisis stalled other components of the project, leaving the Menara Multi Purpose building the only completed structure then, surrounded by several partially completed and abandoned structures (including a second office tower). However, now Capital Square, or CapSquare as it has known, is a fully integrated neighbourhood with a second office tower, retail centre, a luxury residential tower and a second luxury residential tower recently launched.

Menara Multi-Purpose was headquarters to its developers, BRDB, who have now moved to a new headquarters, Menara BRDB, in their homeground of Bangsar.

In December 2016 the building was purchased by the Kumpulan Wang Persaraan (Diperbadankan) (KWAP), the second largest pension fund in Malaysia. With the sale price of RM474.3 million (US$107.25 million), this was the largest office building sale in the country in 2016.

== Access ==
=== Bus ===
The tower is located along Jalan Munshi Abdullah, which is home to a major bus hub. Examples of bus lines starting here are 300 (to Ampang Jaya), 200 (to Gombak) and 100 (to Kuala Selangor).

=== Rail ===
Menara Multi Purpose is within walking distance to Bandaraya, Masjid Jamek and Dang Wangi metro stations, as well as Bank Negara Komuter station.

== See also ==
- List of tallest buildings in Kuala Lumpur
