= Quill City =

Coordinates: 3.159502263114307°N 101.6996711425002°E

Quill City Mall
- Bandar Wawasan
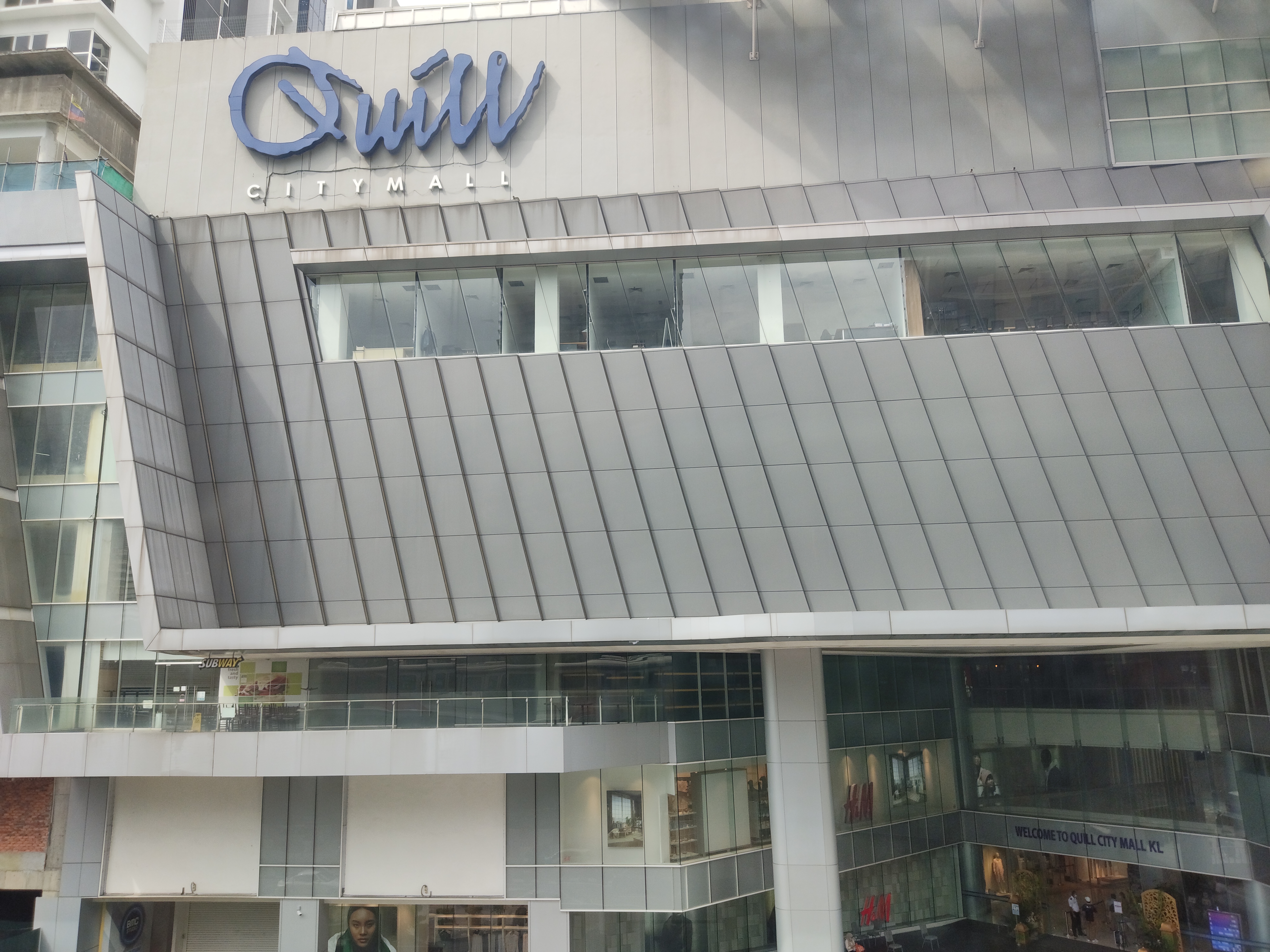
- Interactive map of the Quill City Mall area

General information
- Location: Jalan Sultan Ismail, Kuala Lumpur, Malaysia

Design and construction
- Architect: Sparch Architects
- Developer: Quill Retail Malls Sdn Bhd

Other information
- Public transit: MR9 Medan Tuanku Monorail station

Website
- www.quillcitymall.com.my

Quill City, formerly Vision City and known as Bandar Wawasan in the Malay language, is a partially completed integrated development project located along Jalan Sultan Ismail, close to Kampung Baru in Kuala Lumpur, Malaysia.

== Project ==
The project was originally developed by RHB-Daewoo Sdn Bhd, a former direct subsidiary of Rashid Hussain Berhad. Its partially completed phase one components, composed of three high rise blocks, was one of numerous abandoned and partially completed projects in the city. The Duta Grand Hyatt and Plaza Rakyat were other notable ones. Financial difficulties faced by the original developer resulted in the abandonment of the Vision City development project.

The partially completed and abandoned components of Vision City included a retail mall block, a high rise office block, and an apartment block. These uncompleted portions were acquired by developer Quill Retail Malls in 2007, and the entire project was renamed Quill City. The retail building was completed as the Quill City Mall, which opened on 16 October 2014. Quill planned to launch the residential building project sometime in 2014, and the 40-storey office tower later.

=== Design ===
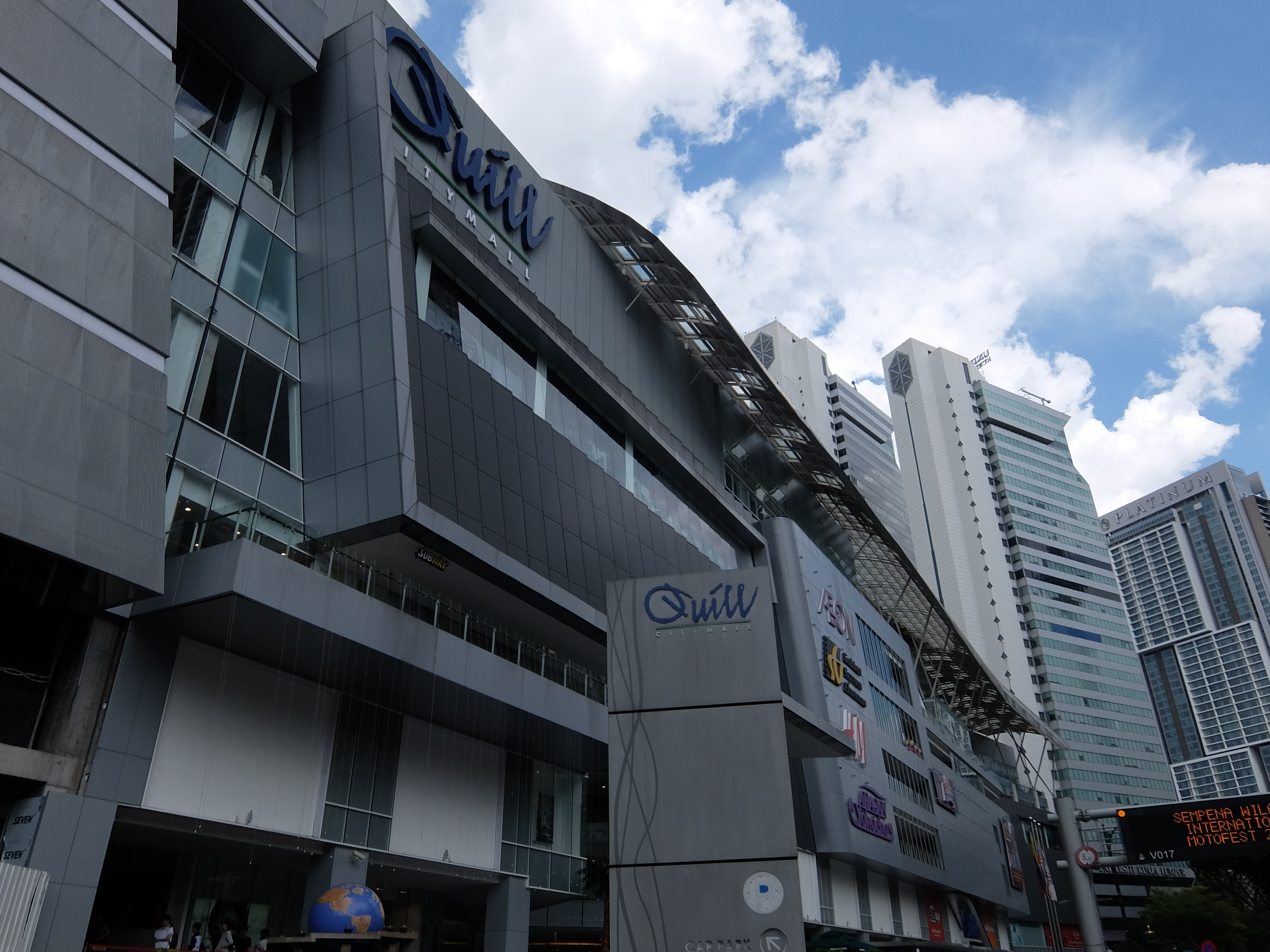
Quill City Mall from street

The pre-approved development order for the original Vision City project includes the construction of a seven-level retail centre with a net lettable area of 752,000 sq ft (69,900 m^{2}), and a 35-story office tower with 500,000 sq ft (46,000 m^{2}) of net lettable area, a 45-storey 450-unit serviced apartment block and 2,280 car park lots. In August 2009, Sparch Architects revealed their proposed design for the retail mall redevelopment, which features a garden in a naturally-ventilated sheltered cut-through at the central portion of the mall.

== History ==
In 1995, RHB Daewoo acquired the piece of land covering 4.6 hectares (11.5 acres) on which the Vision City development is located. From 1996 through 2005, RHB Daewoo sold the three currently completed office towers that form part of the Vision City development.

Before its construction, RHB Daewoo secured the sale of Office Tower 1, which now stands 29 storeys tall. The building was sold to Bank Industri Bhd (now known as Bank Pembangunan Malaysia Berhad), a development financial institution owned by the Malaysian government. The building was completed and handed over to the purchaser in 2000, and currently houses the corporation's headquarters. Office Tower 2, standing 33 storeys tall, was also completed in 2000 and was sold to Dewan Bandaraya Kuala Lumpur (Kuala Lumpur City Hall) for RM108.2 million. Office Tower 2 currently houses one of the two main headquarters of Dewan Bandaraya Kuala Lumpur. The 31-storey Office Tower 3 was completed in 2001 and was sold to Majlis Amanah Rakyat (MARA) for RM105 million. This building currently houses the city campus of the University of Kuala Lumpur.

In 2007, Vision City Sdn Bhd, the developer that had since changed its name from RHB Daewoo, sold all the remaining uncompleted components of the development project to Quill Retail Malls Sdn Bhd for RM430 million. The uncompleted components include a piece of land for a fourth office block with an adjacent parcel of vacant land of 397 sq meters, a partially completed retail centre and a partially completed apartment block.

== Shopping mall ==
The retail component of the project, known as Quill City Mall, was opened on 16 October 2014, in a nod to its address - lot 1018, Jalan Sultan Ismail. The mall featured seven storeys of retail outlets, with AEON being the anchor as well as main tenants like Golden Screen Cinemas and H&M. This was AEON's first store in downtown Kuala Lumpur in a quarter-century since the Plaza Dayabumi store closed in 1989. GSC has a cinema on the fifth floor above ground.

Few years later, the AEON supermarket had finally closed down and was then replaced by NSK Grocer, a homegrown supermarket chain by NSK Trade City wholesaler. The supermarket was officially opened on 20 December 2021 as the first outlet in Malaysia and spans over 85,000 square feet (7,900 m^{2})of space.

Quill City Mall is linked to Medan Tuanku Monorail station by a bridge on the second floor. Alternately Dang Wangi and Sultan Ismail stations are 400-metre and 600 metre walks away, respectively.

Quill City Mall
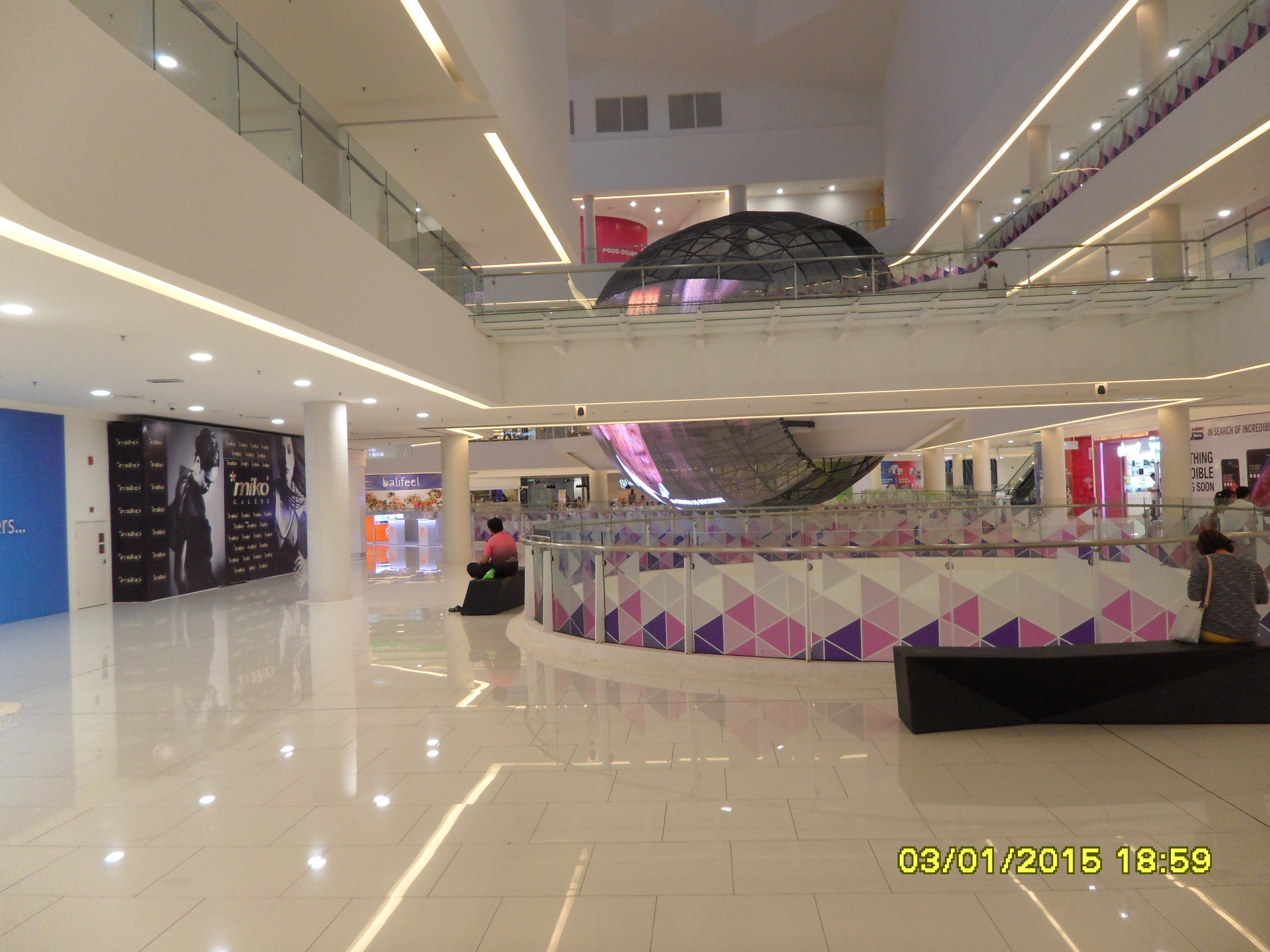
Quill City Mall interior

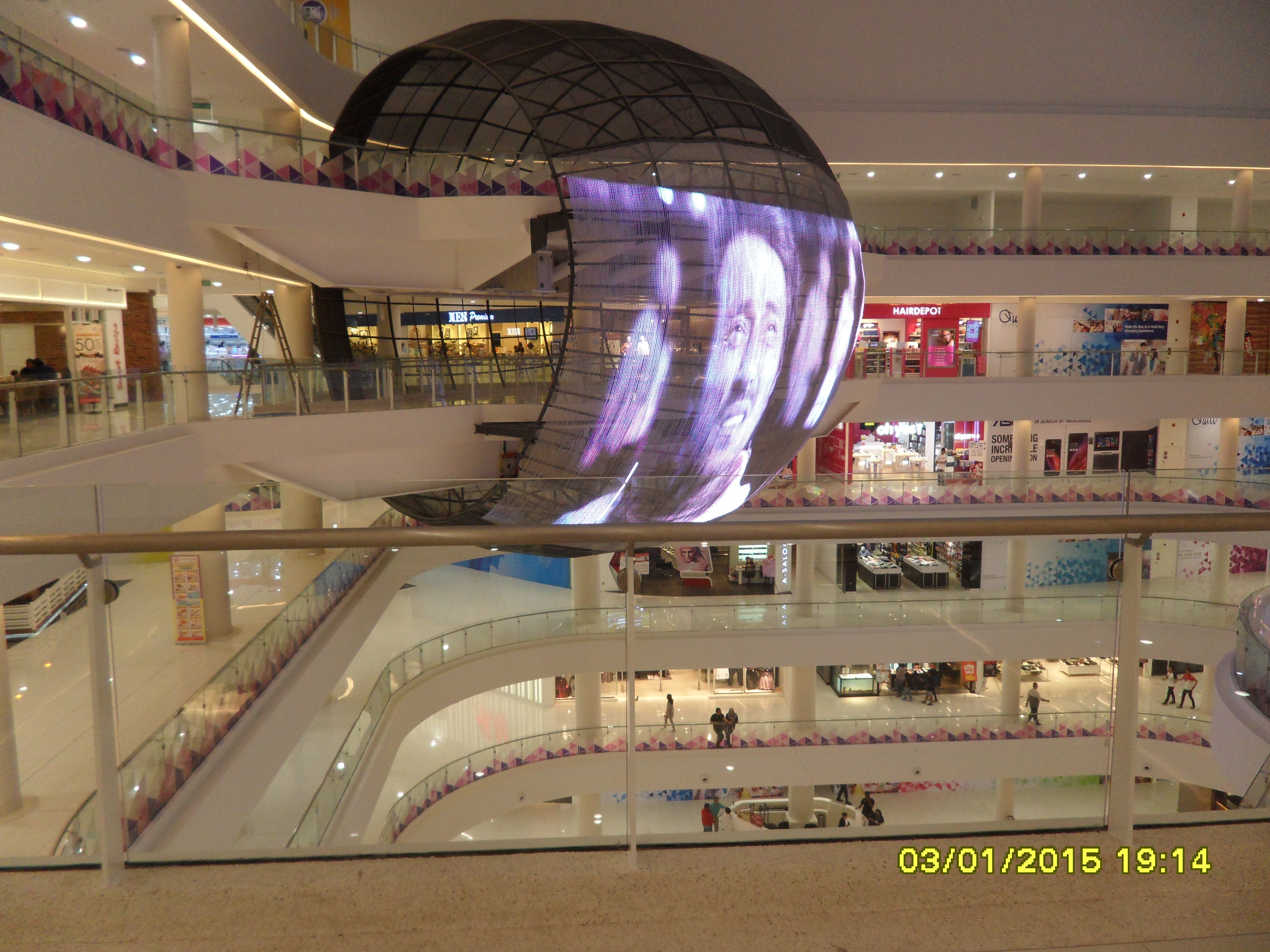
Spherical projection screen

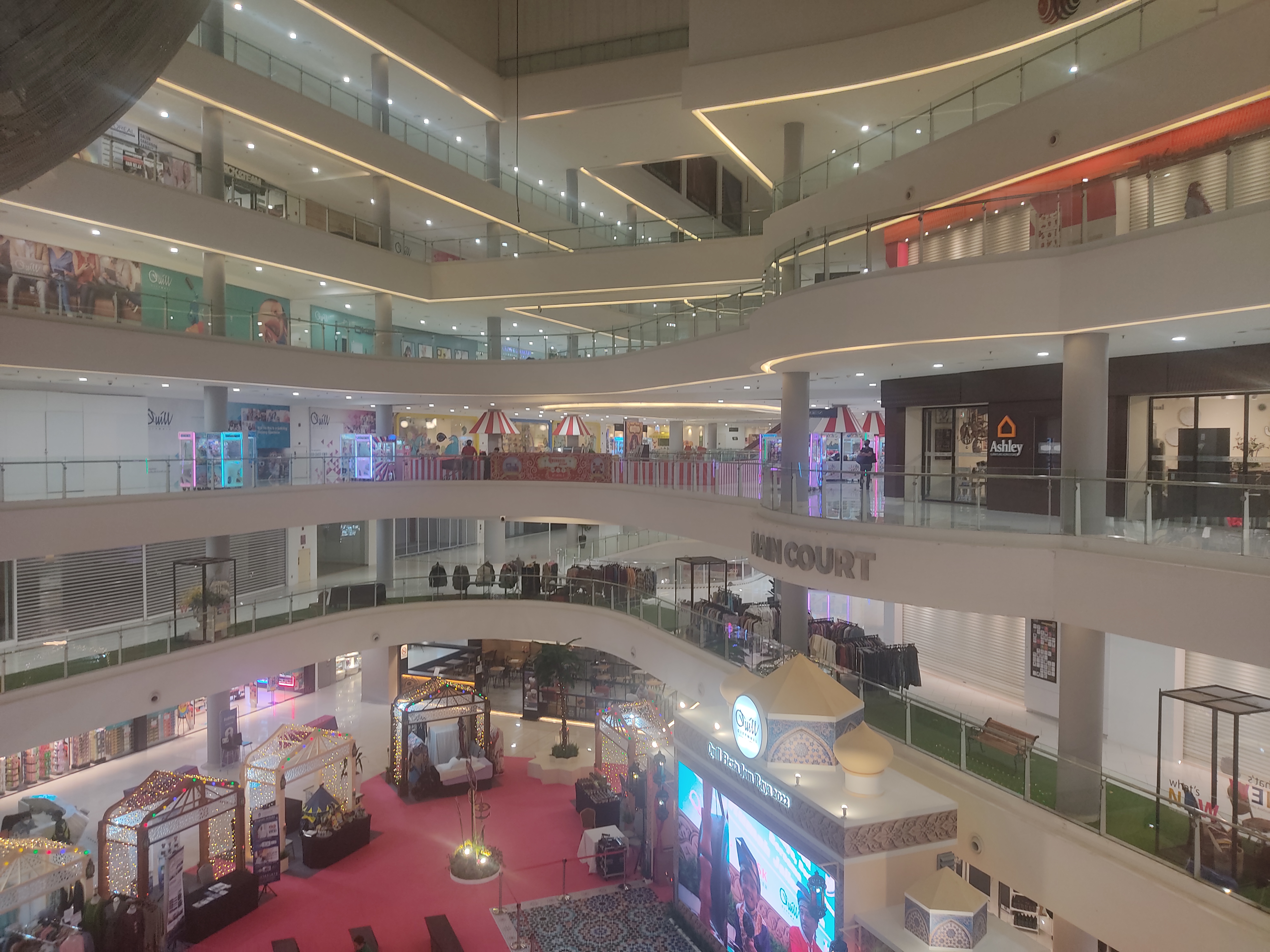
Retail floors at a glance

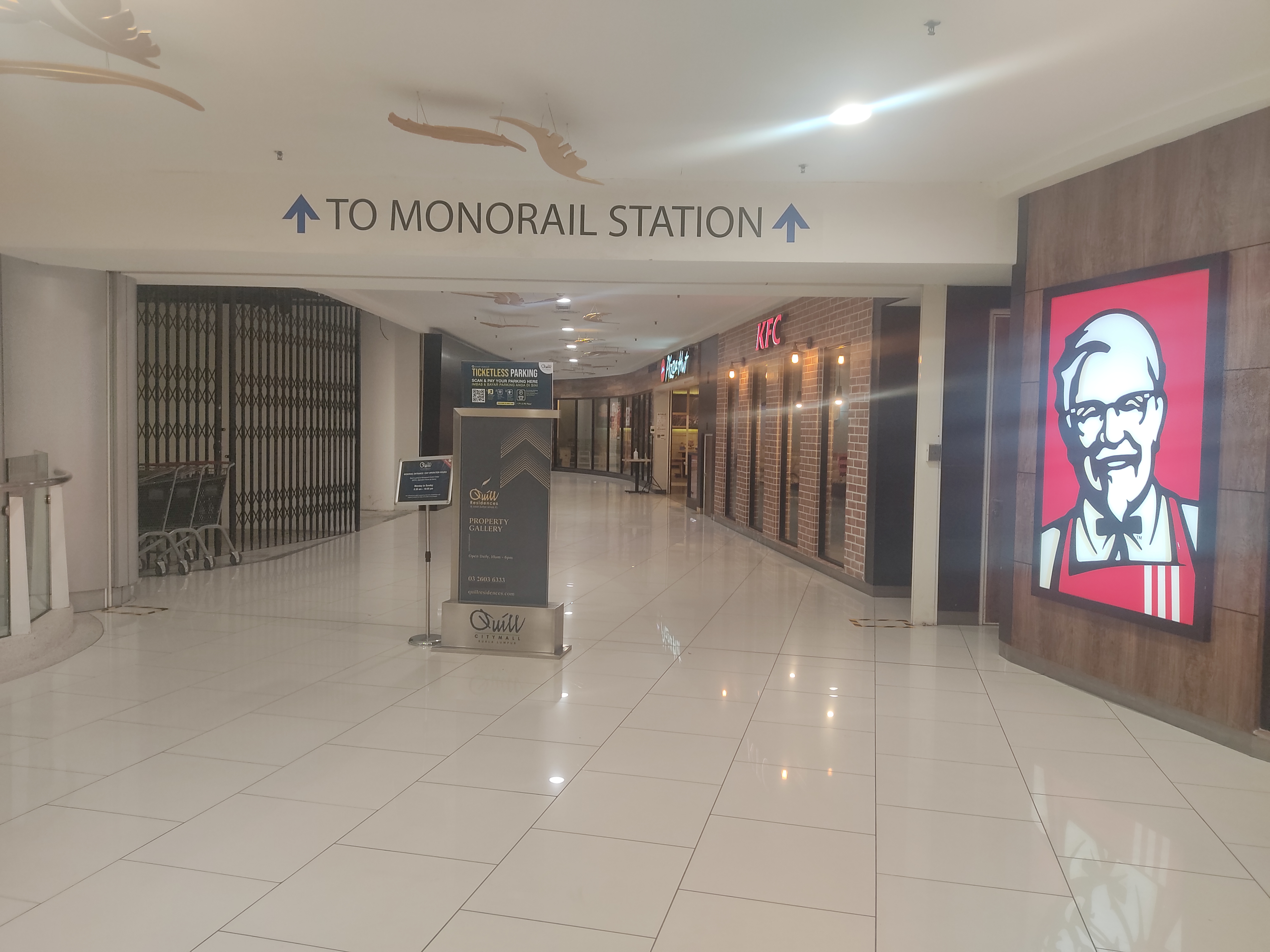
Medan Tuanku Monorail Entrance from Quill City Mall

== See also ==
- Buildings and structures in Kuala Lumpur
- Shopping malls in Malaysia
