= Capital Square =

Capital Square Condominiums
- Kondominium Capital Square
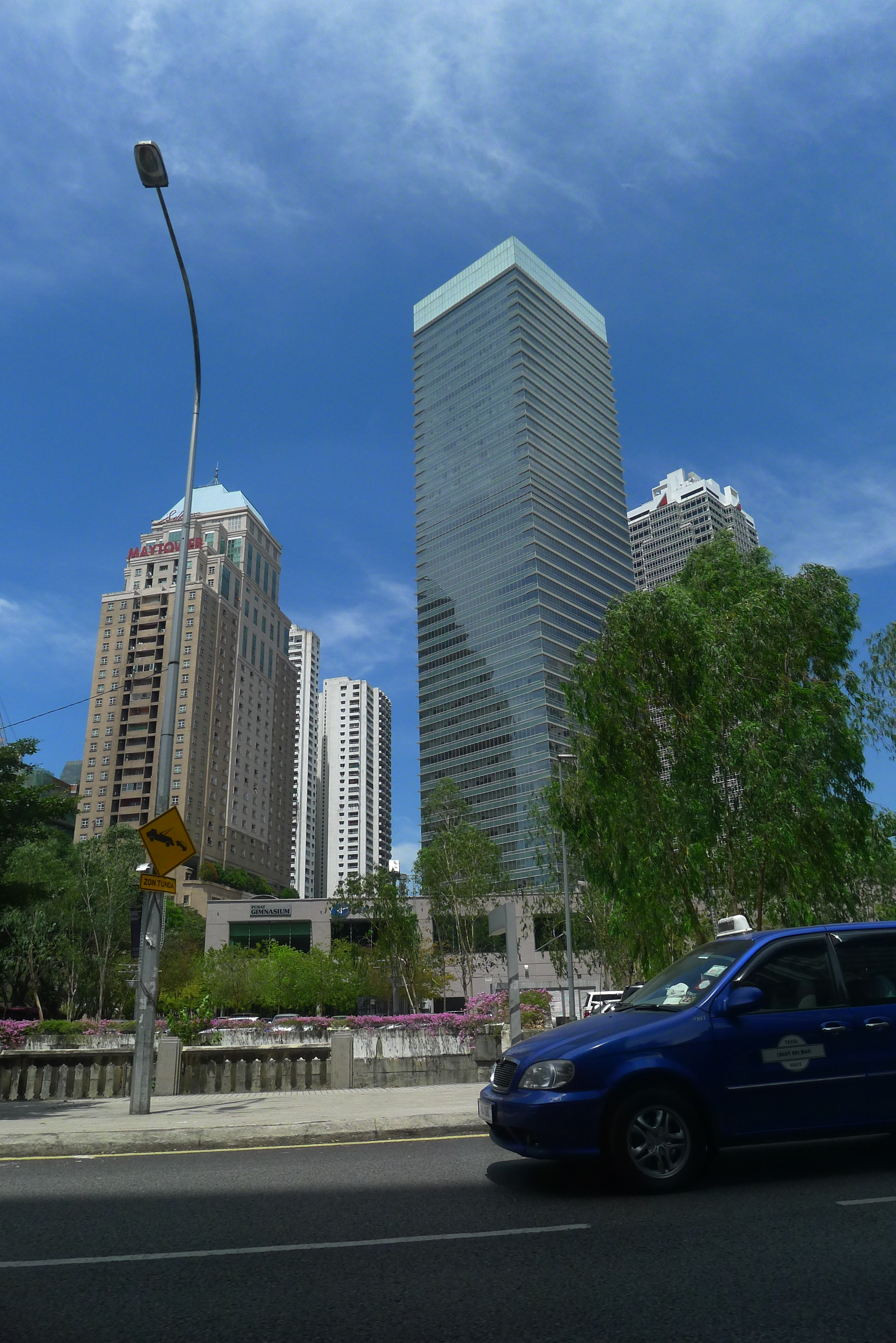
- Alternative names: Cap Square

General information
- Type: Residential condominium Commercial retail
- Location: Jalan Munshi Abdullah; Kuala Lumpur, Malaysia
- Coordinates: 3.15490°N 101.70063°E
- Completed: 2011

Technical details
- Floor count: 42; 4 (retail)

Design and construction
- Architect: John Portman & Associates
- Developer: Bandar Raya Developments Berhad

Cap Square Mall
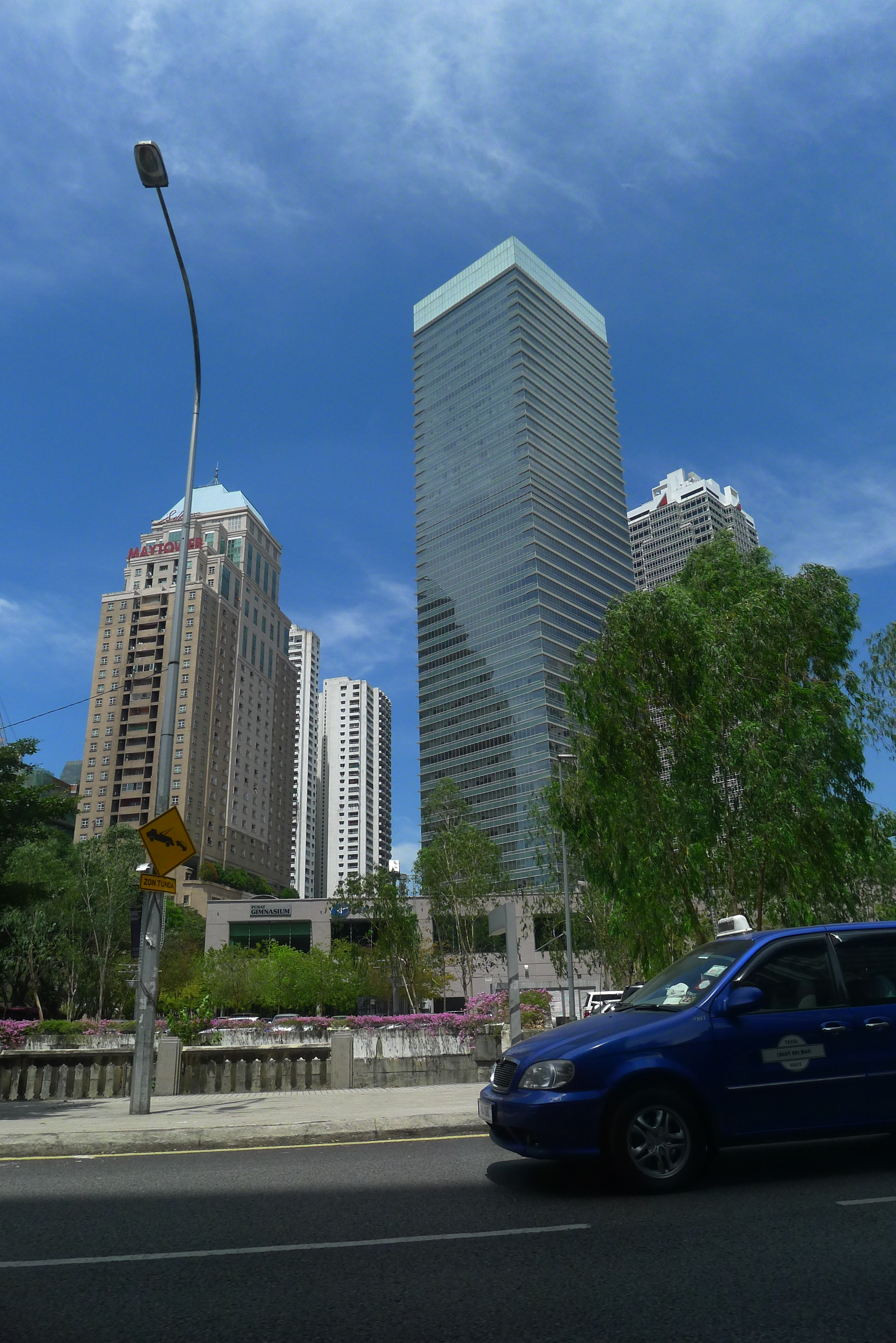
- Cap Square Tower (the fully glass tower block that was previously the stalled OT2 office block) stands completed in 2014. Menara Multi-Purpose can be seen behind it.
- Location: Jalan Munshi Abdullah; Kuala Lumpur, Malaysia
- Coordinates: 3.15490°N 101.70063°E
- Developer: Bandar Raya Developments Berhad
- Architect: John Portman & Associates
- Floor area: 150,000 m^{2} (1,600,000 sq ft)
- Floors: 4
- Website: www.capsquare.com.my

Capital Square, commonly referred to as Cap Square, is a residential condominium skyscraper and shopping mall along Jalan Munshi Abdullah, in midtown in Kuala Lumpur, Malaysia, developed by Bandar Raya Developments Berhad. Apart from retail spaces, the development encompasses one 36-storey condominium block and one office block under phase 2. Phase 1, which comprised a single 40-storey office block, Menara Multi Purpose, was completed back in 1994. Menara Multi-Purpose is also home to Bandar Raya Developments Berhad's corporate headquarters. The completed 36-storey residence component of the Cap Square development comprises 180 apartment units.

== History ==
In the 1930s what is now CapSquare was once a public park as well as an Eastern Hotel; after World War II the park was replaced by several cinemas.

Development of Capital Square was put on hold since 1997 due to the Asian financial crisis. The only fully completed structure then was the Menara Multi-Purpose, which was completed in 1994. Construction of a second office block (OT2) stalled and its partially completed structure remained abandoned for about 10 years. In January 2008, Bandar Raya Developments Berhad announced that it had entered into a conditional sales and purchase agreement with Union Investment Real Estate AG for the en bloc sale of the 41-storey OT2 for RM439 million. Construction of OT2 has since resumed and was completed in 2011.

== Events ==
On 28 March 2009, Cap Square held a night charity walk in conjunction with Earth Hour.

UAE-based Lulu Hypermarket has opened its first Malaysian store in the project in June 2016.

== Access ==
There is the Jalan Munshi Abdullah bus hub opposite Cap Square, served by rapidKL, SJ Bus Selangor Omnibus and GoKL. The complex is also near LRT Masjid Jamek, LRT Bandaraya, KTM Bank Negara and LRT Dang Wangi.

== See also ==
- Menara Multi Purpose
- List of tallest buildings in Kuala Lumpur
