= Medan Tuanku =

Neighbourhood of Kuala Lumpur

Coordinates: 3.1591487°N 101.6804192°E

Medan Tuanku is a major area in downtown Kuala Lumpur. Jalan Medan Tuanku and Jalan Tuanku Abdul Rahman are the primary roads in this area. Medan Tuanku borders Dang Wangi to the east and south and Chow Kit to the north.

== Attractions ==
The Maju Junction shopping centre is located here, as well as the Quill City Mall. Loke Yew's mansion is located in a secluded corner of this ward. It was built in 1906.

== Public transportation ==
Medan Tuanku lends its name to the Medan Tuanku Monorail station. The Dang Wangi and Sultan Ismail LRT stations are nearby.
