= Semarak =

Coordinates: 3.17783°N 101.7211489°E

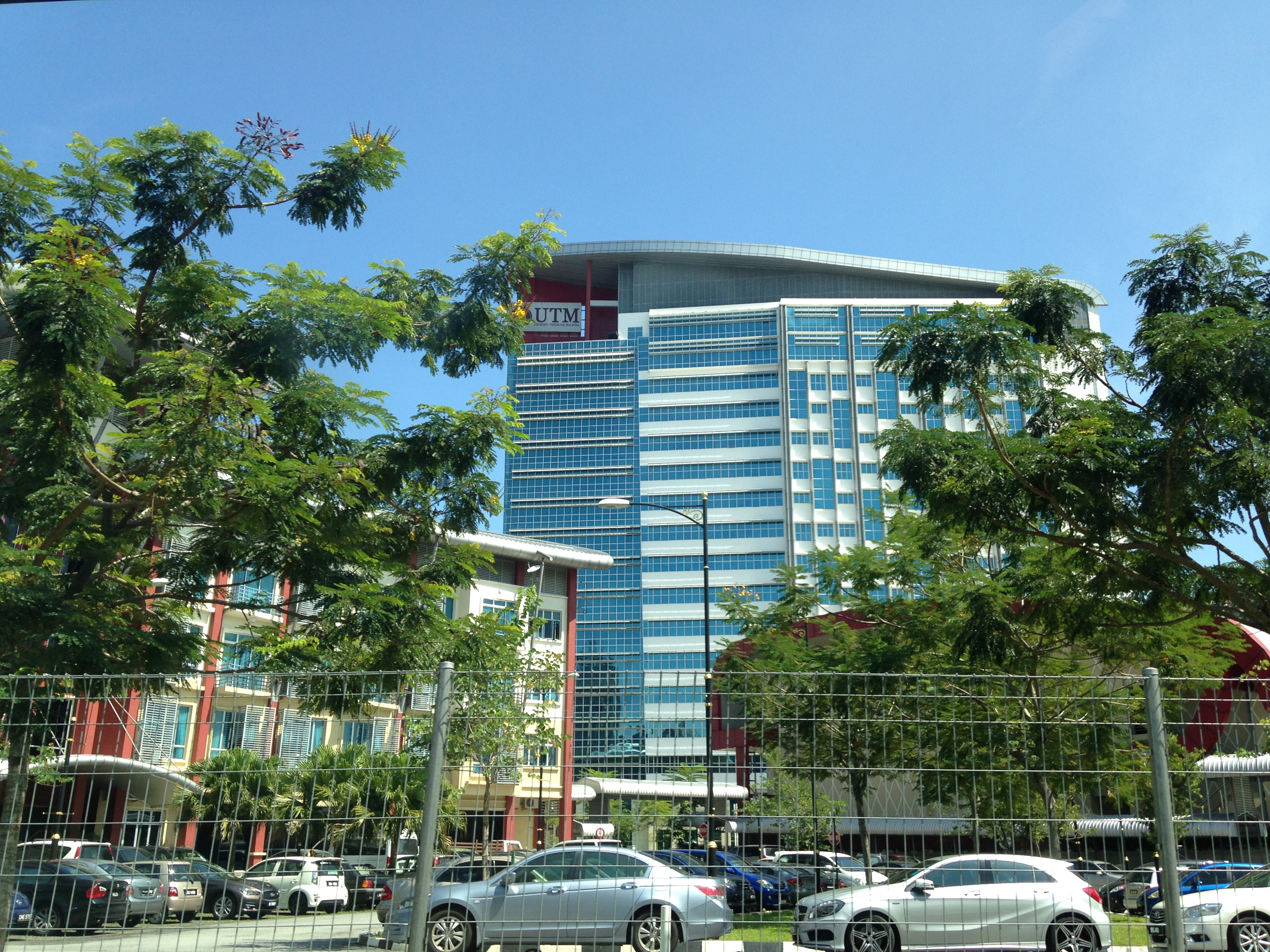
Menara Razak at the Kuala Lumpur campus of Universiti Teknologi Malaysia

Semarak or Jalan Sultan Yahya Petra (formerly Jalan Semarak and firstly Jalan Henry Gurney) is a main place in Kuala Lumpur. The Royal Malaysian Police Academy (PULAPOL) and Ministry of Defence Headquarters (Sri Pahlawan) is located here.

Other notable place of interests are the Kuala Lumpur Campus (formerly UTM International Campus) of Universiti Teknologi Malaysia, the oldest public engineering and technological university in Malaysia, which was built in 1946, with new buildings (Menara Razak) and a mosque built in 2012. Offices of JUPEM (Jabatan Ukur dan Pemetaan Malaysia), one of the Kuala Lumpur centres of Alliance Francaise and the Kuala Lumpur campus of Multimedia College (subsidiary of Multimedia University) is also located there.
