= Taman Wahyu =

Residential area in Kampung Batu, Kuala Lumpur, Malaysia

Coordinates: 6°00′N 102°01′E

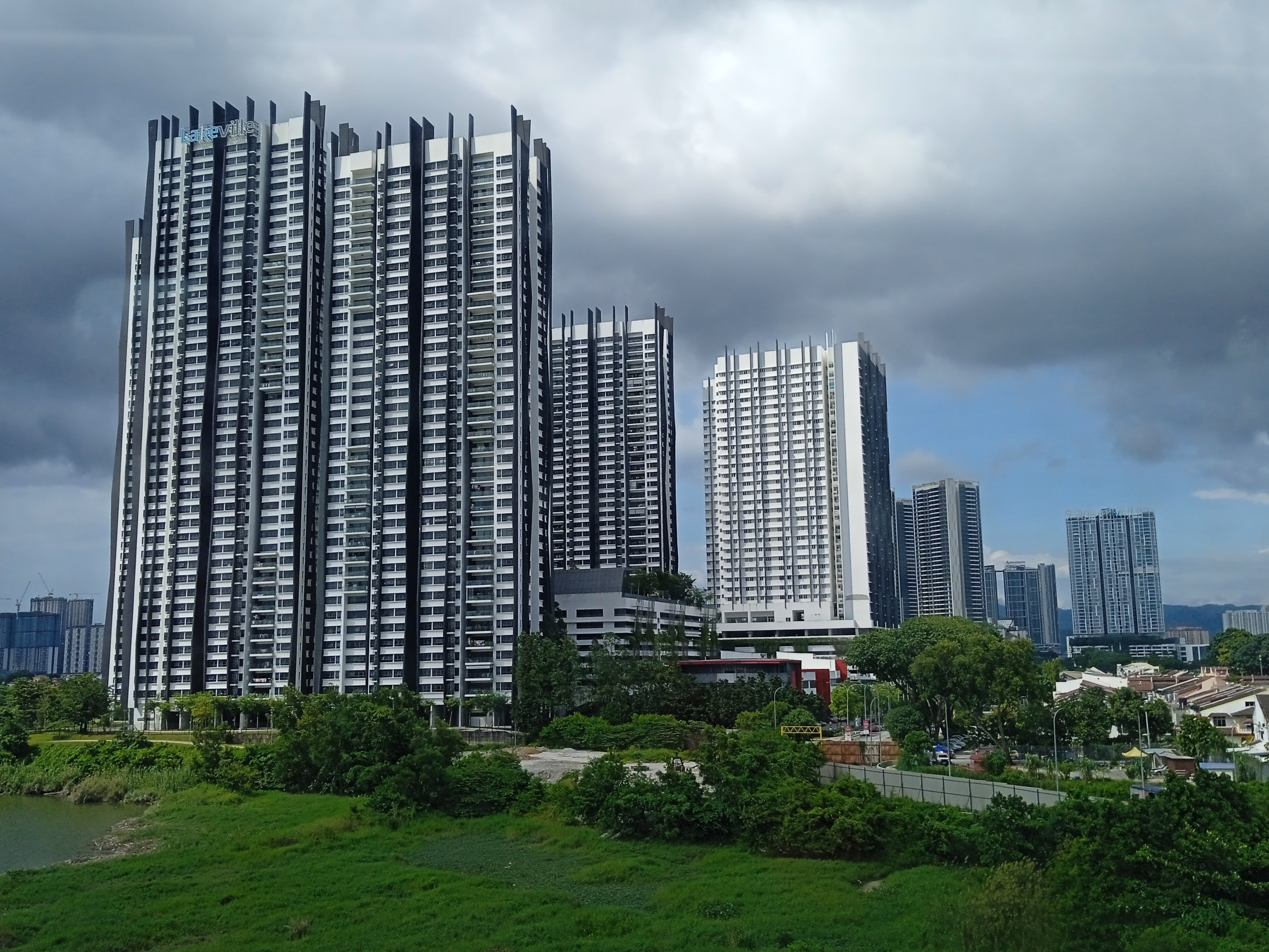
Taman Wahyu

Taman Wahyu is a residential area in Kampung Batu, Kuala Lumpur, Malaysia. The main inhabitants are Chinese. A Chinese primary school is located about 1.5 kilometers from Taman Wahyu. There are also several coffee shops and a Chinese traditional herb store.

The area contains four water retention ponds: Batu, Nanyang, Delima, and Wahyu. These have experienced flash flooding after heavy rains, raising concerns about pollution from trash. A high-rise condominium was proposed to be built on one of the retention ponds, drawing concern from residents about the risk of further flooding.

== Transportation ==
- Taman Wahyu KTM Komuter Station

== Entertainment ==
Every Friday, a night market is held at Taman Wahyu.
