= Dang Wangi =

Coordinates: 3°09′23.9″N 101°41′52.2″E

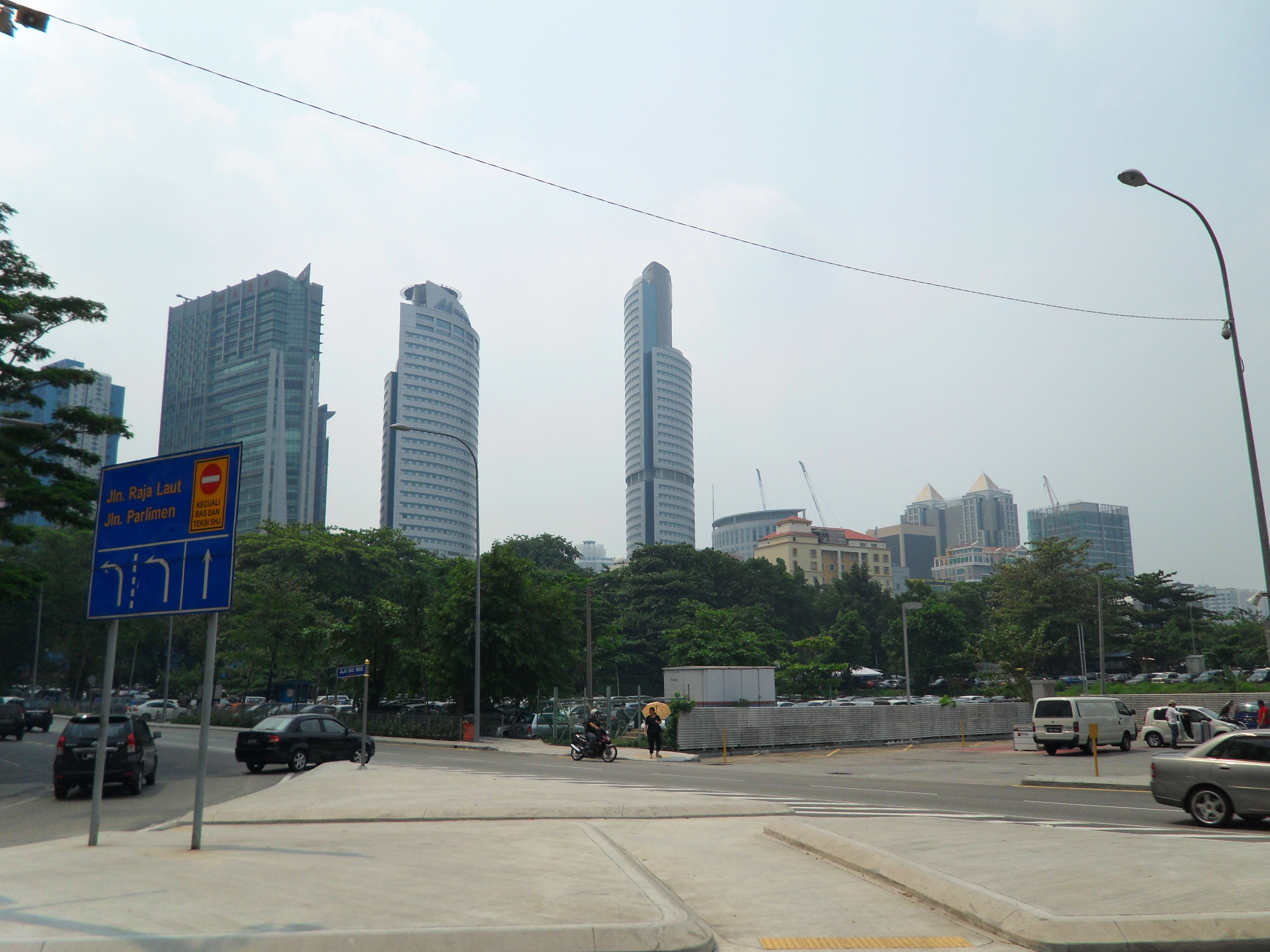
Dang Wangi

Dang Wangi is an area in the city centre of Kuala Lumpur, Malaysia, situated north of Dataran Merdeka, bordering Bukit Nanas and Medan Tuanku and located between the Gombak and Klang Rivers. The name is derived from Hang Jebat's wife. A road that cuts across the ward, Dang Wangi Road (Malay: Jalan Dang Wangi), formerly known as Campbell Road, is named after the ward. Running in an east–west orientation, it interchanges into Jalan Tuanku Abdul Rahman on its western end and Jalan Ampang on its eastern end.

The Dang Wangi LRT Station, part of the LRT Kelana Jaya Line, is located on the northeast side of the district.
