= Star Residences =

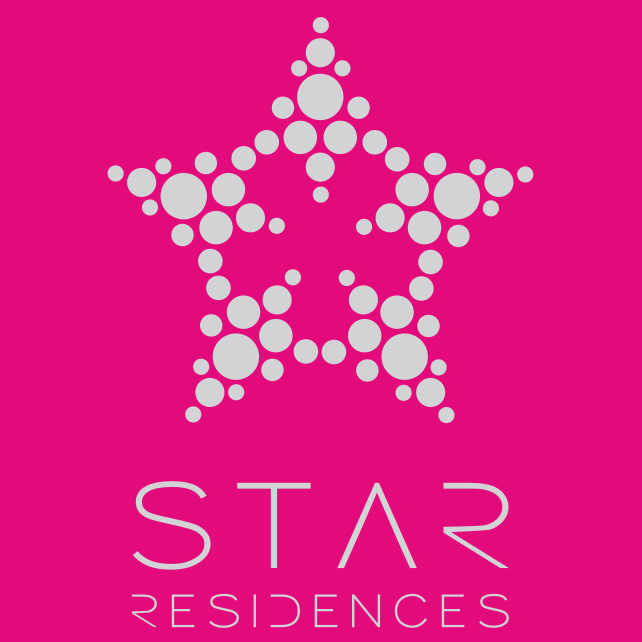
- Official wordmark

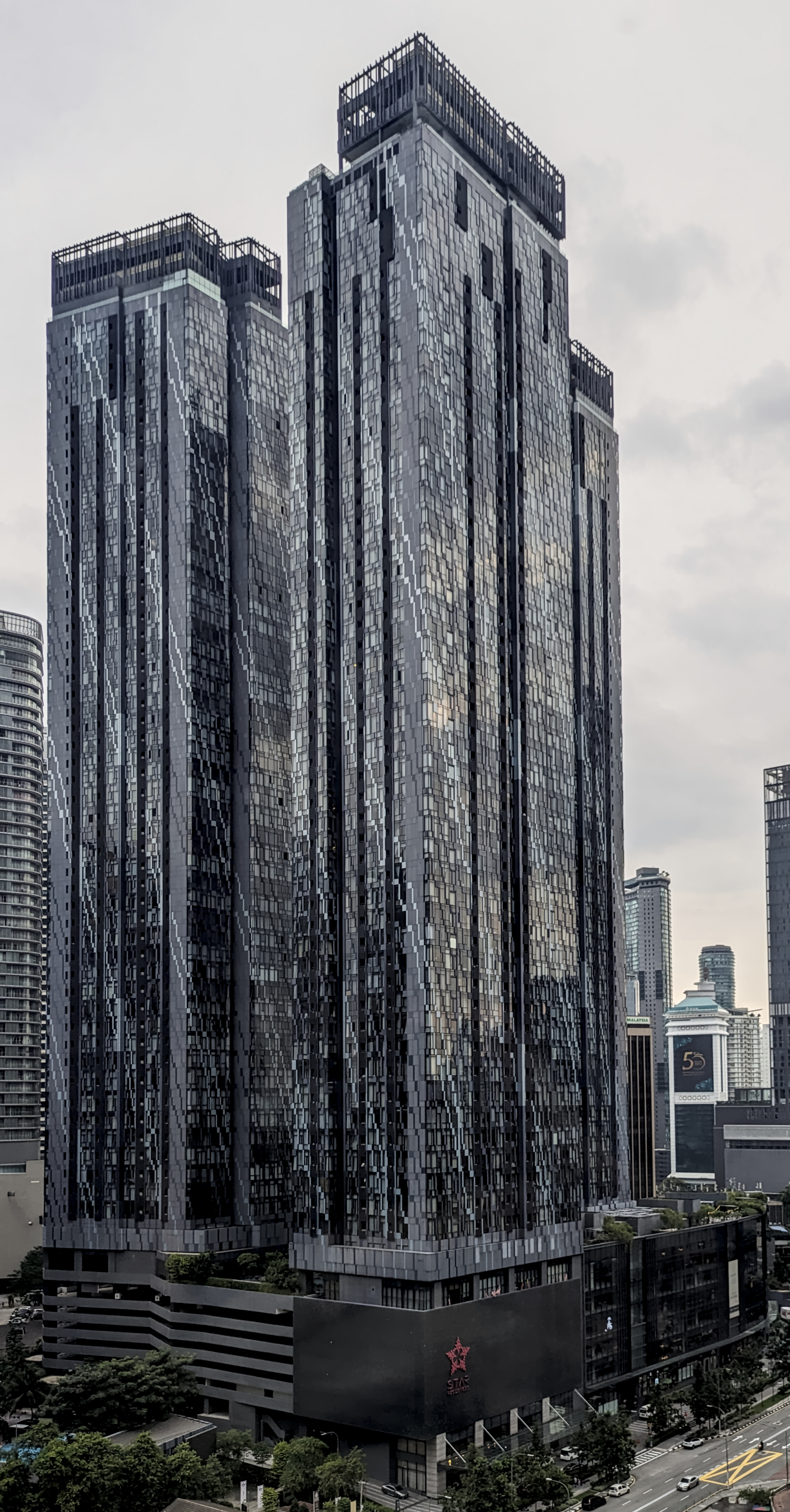
- Star Residences in 2024
- Interactive map of the Star Residences area
- Alternative names: Star Residences KLCC

General information
- Status: Completed
- Type: Residential
- Location: Jalan Yap Kwan Seng, Kuala Lumpur, Malaysia
- Coordinates: 3.1634°N 101.7160°E
- Completed: Tower 1: November 2019; Tower 2: November 2020; Tower 3: May 2022

Height
- Roof: Tower 1: 251 m (823 ft); Tower 2: 265 m (869 ft); Tower 3: 265 m (869 ft)
- Top floor: Tower 1: 57; Tower 2: 58; Tower 3: 58

Design and construction
- Architect: Veritas Design Group
- Developer: Alpine Return Sdn Bhd (a joint venture between Symphony Life and UMLand); Samsung C&T

Other information
- Number of units: Tower 1: 557; Tower 2: 482; Tower 3: 471

Star Residences is a three-tower residential complex in Kuala Lumpur with a total of 1510 apartments.

All three buildings surpass the 250-meter threshold. As of 2024, they are the tallest residential buildings in Malaysia.

== Location ==
Star Residences is built alongside the Star Boulevard at Jalan Yap Kwan Seng. The avenue connects with KLCC in 400 meters, to the square in front of the Petronas Towers.

== Facilities ==
Star Residences offer an extensive range of facilities which include infinity pools, common ground-level swimming pool, rooftop terrace, fitness center, sports lounge, banquet halls, meeting rooms and others.

The uppermost floors of the three towers are adorned with intricate mosaic tile murals portrayed as Polar Bears, Butterfly, and Panda. These murals, measuring a combined length of 58.77 meters, have been recognized by the Malaysia Book of Records as the largest mosaic tiles wall mural art in the country.

== Gallery ==
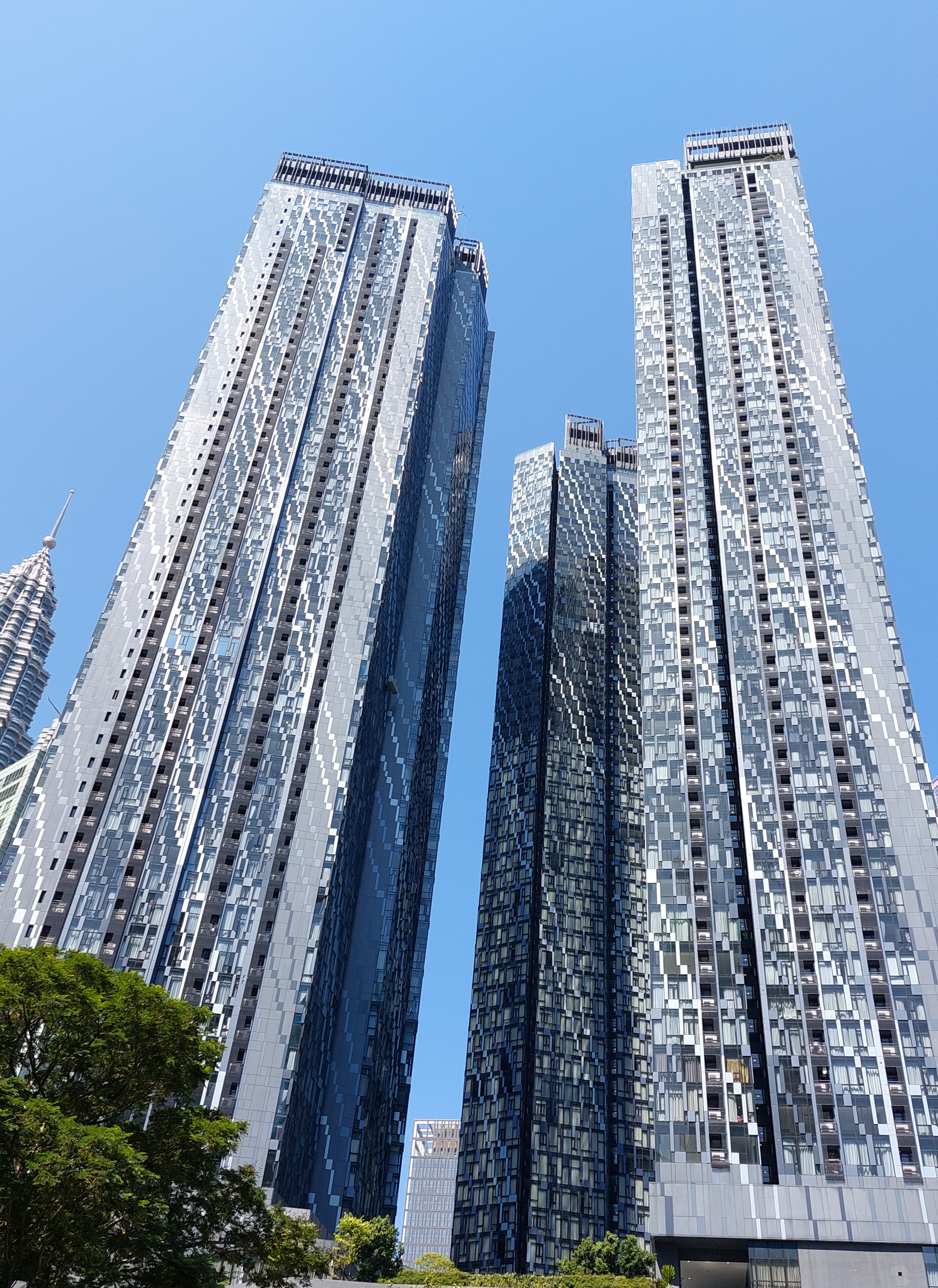
Image from east

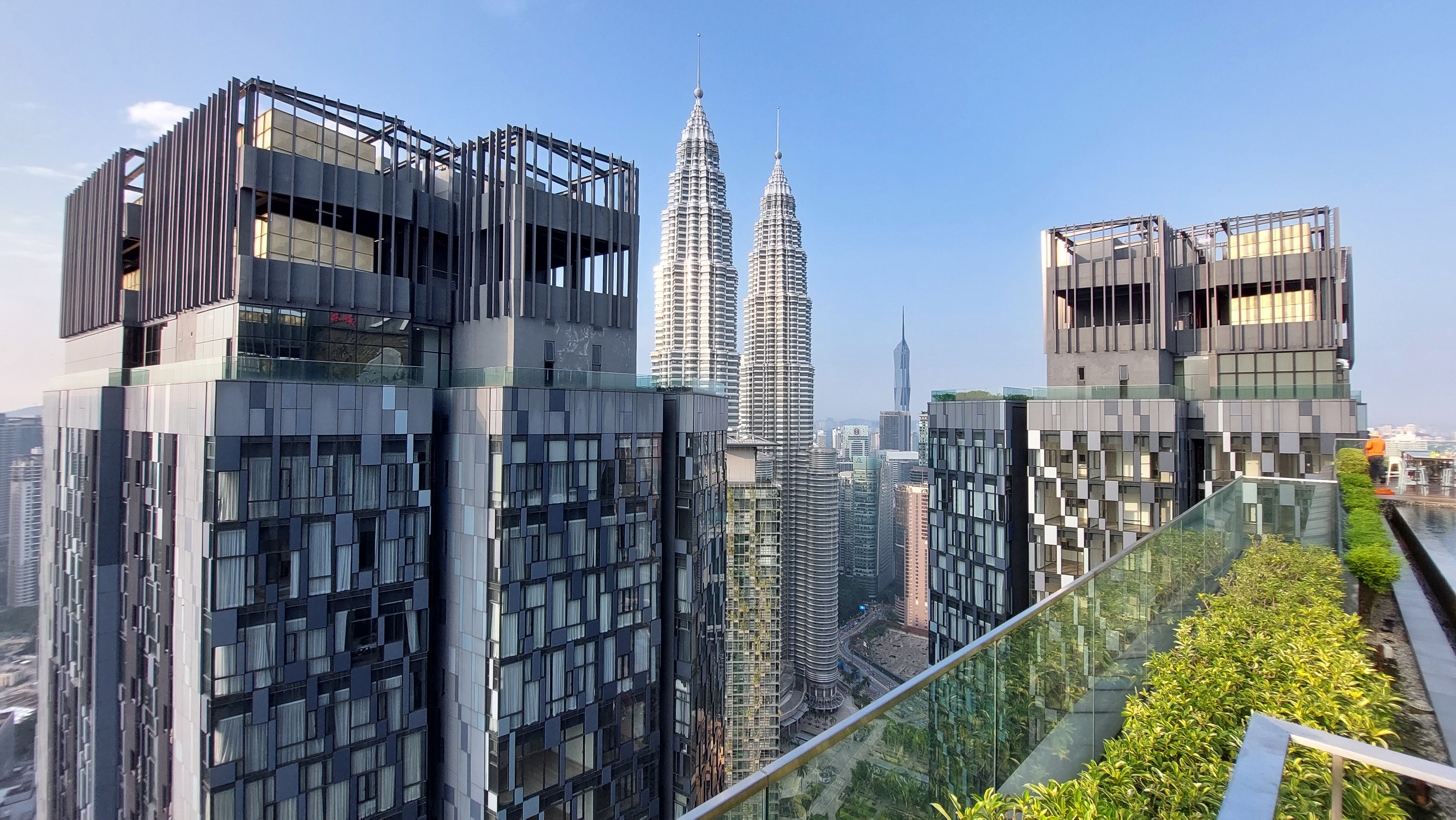
View from Tower 1. On left, Tower 2. On right, Tower 3. In front, the Petronas Towers. At far end, Merdeka 118

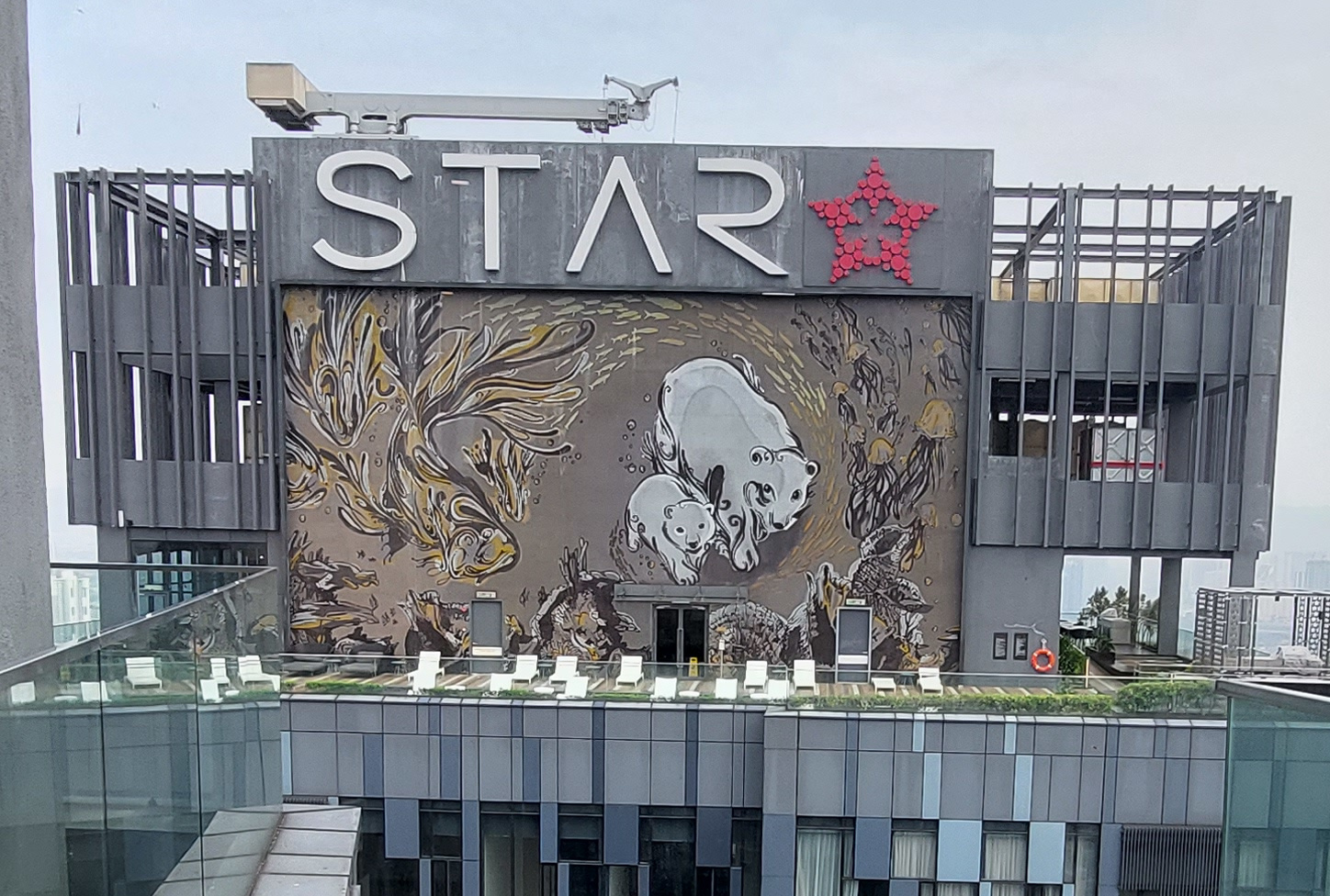
Polar Bears Mosaic
