= Kampung Baru, Kuala Lumpur =

Area of central Kuala Lumpur, Malaysia

Kampung Baru gate

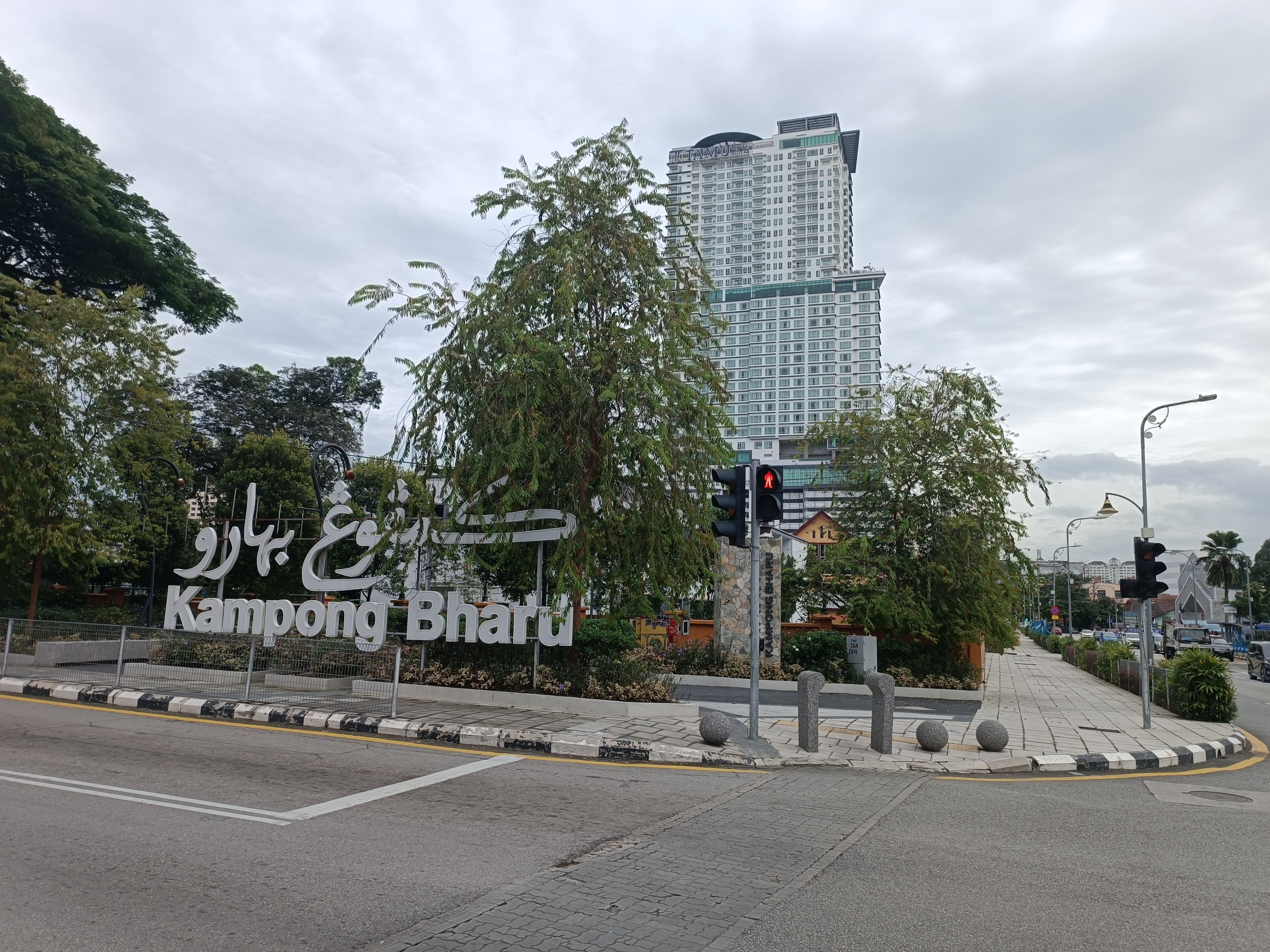
Laman Kampong Bharu

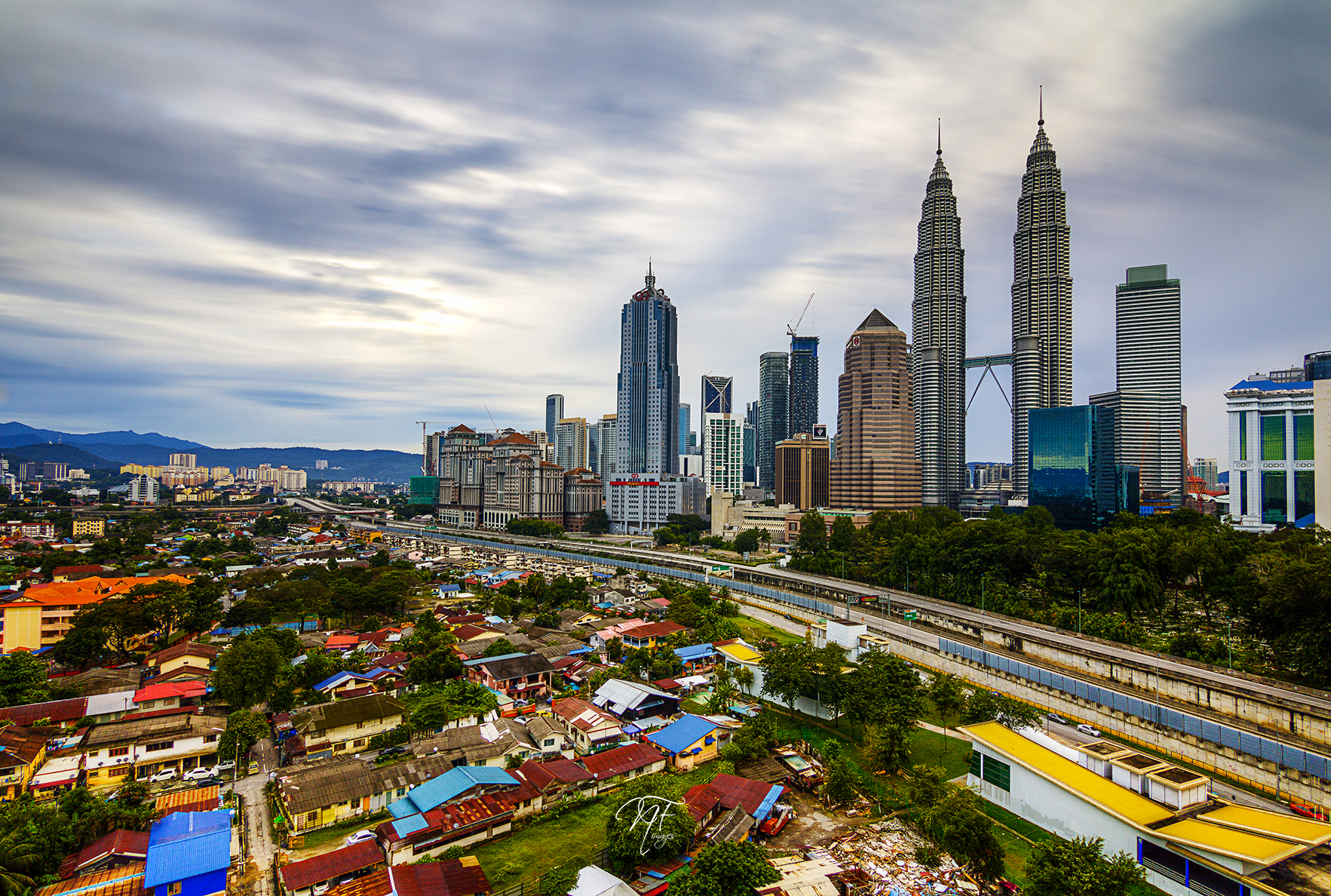
Kampung Baru

Kampung Baru or Kampong Bharu (meaning "New Village") is a Malay enclave and village (kampung) in central Kuala Lumpur, Malaysia.

== Location ==
Kampung Baru is located in the northern part of Kuala Lumpur's central business district. It is separated from KLCC district by a section of the Klang River.

Kampung Baru is bordered by Jalan Tun Razak in the north, Jalan Tuanku Abdul Rahman in the west, Jalan Dewan Sultan Sulaiman in the southwest, and the Klang River and the Ampang-KL toll road (E 12) in the southeast.

Clockwise, from north to south, Kampung Baru borders Titiwangsa, Dato' Keramat, Ampang Hilir, KLCC, Medan Tuanku and Chow Kit.

== History ==
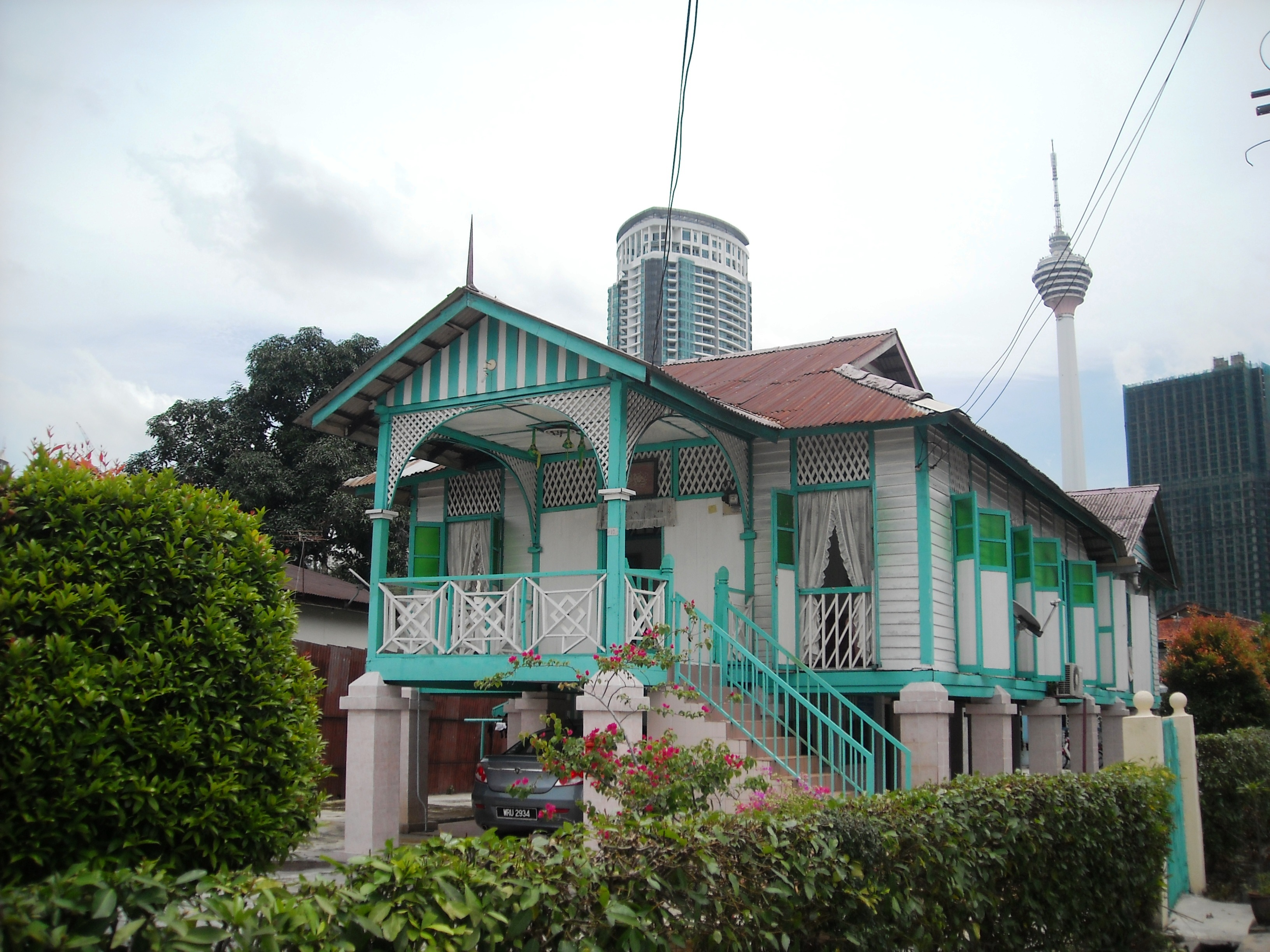
Traditional house in Kampung Baru, Kuala Lumpur

Kampung Baru was established in 1899 by a grant from the then-Sultan of Selangor, Sultan Alaeddin Suleiman Shah, to allow the Malays to retain their village lifestyle within the city. It was formally gazetted as the Malay Agricultural Settlement in 1950.

Since then Kampung Baru has held out against development and modern-city living, turning into a political symbol of Malay culture.

The area held a special place for Malay politics during the pro-independence movement that grew up after World War II. Kampung Baru is home to the Sultan Sulaiman Club (3°9′41.35″N 101°42′3.75″E), where anti-colonial political gatherings were often held, including those that led to the formation of the United Malays National Organisation (UMNO), Malaysia's ruling party since independence until 2018, and then again since 2021. Documents dating back to the period were unearthed at the grounds of the Club several years ago.

Kampung Baru, which sprawls over almost 4 km^{2}, was among the hardest-hit areas during the May 13 Incident in 1969, where bloody racial clashes occurred between ethnic Malays and Chinese. The riots started after Chinese-led opposition parties marched through the village to celebrate their good showing in the general elections of that year.

In recent years, Kampung Baru also played a central role in the Reformasi protests of 1998, when former deputy premier Anwar Ibrahim launched protests against then premier Mahathir Mohamad, calling for reforms to government and the judiciary.

== Developments ==
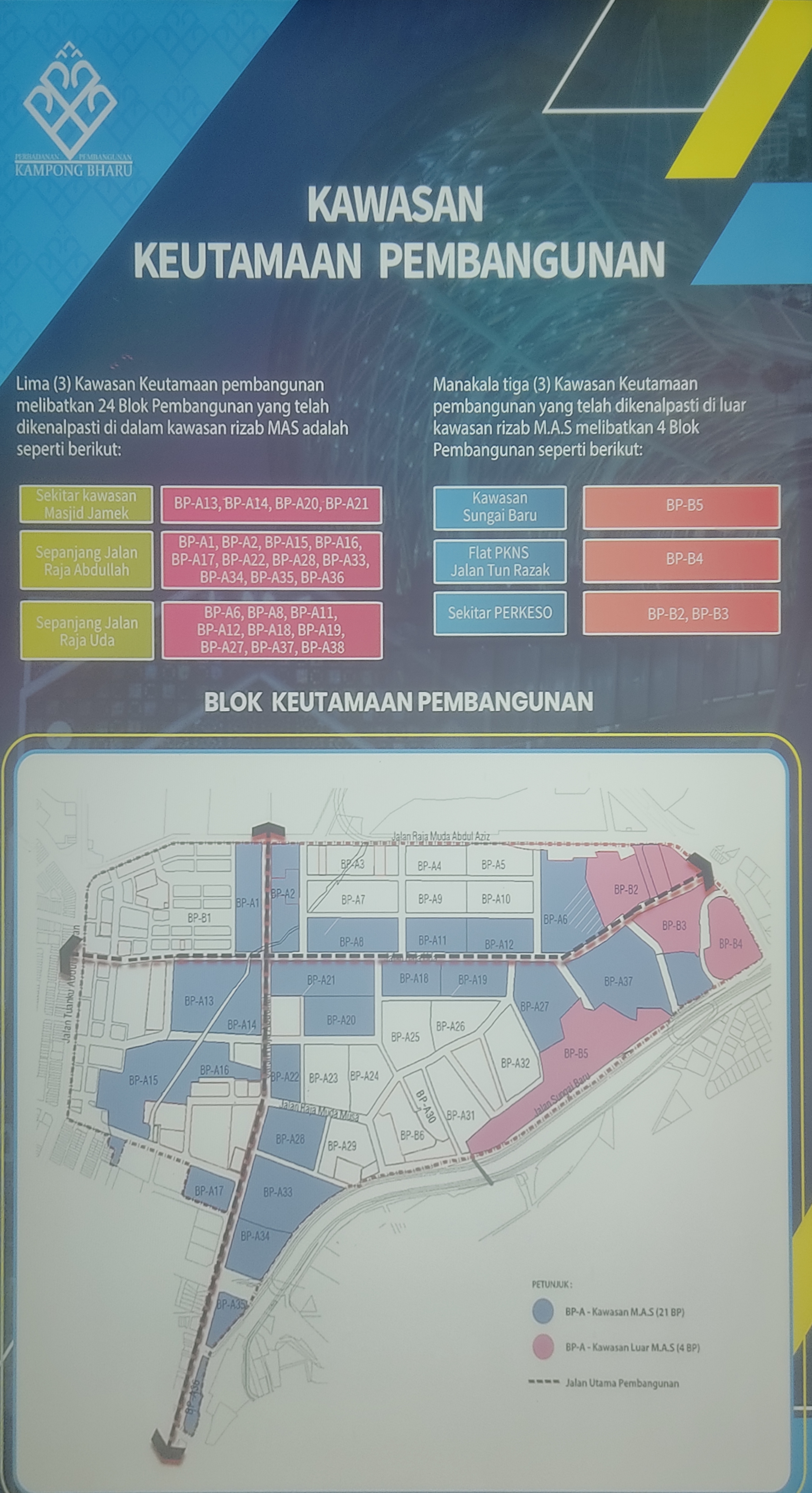
The plan shows Kampung Baru had divided into many small blocks and some of them around the main roads are set to be redevelop in the future.

Plans to redevelop Kampung Baru had been around since the 2000s, and intensified in recent years. Negotiations between kampung residents and successive governments have been ongoing since 2018.

Jalan Raja Muda Musa is one of the main street in Kampung Baru that famous for local dishes e.g. Nasi Lemak.

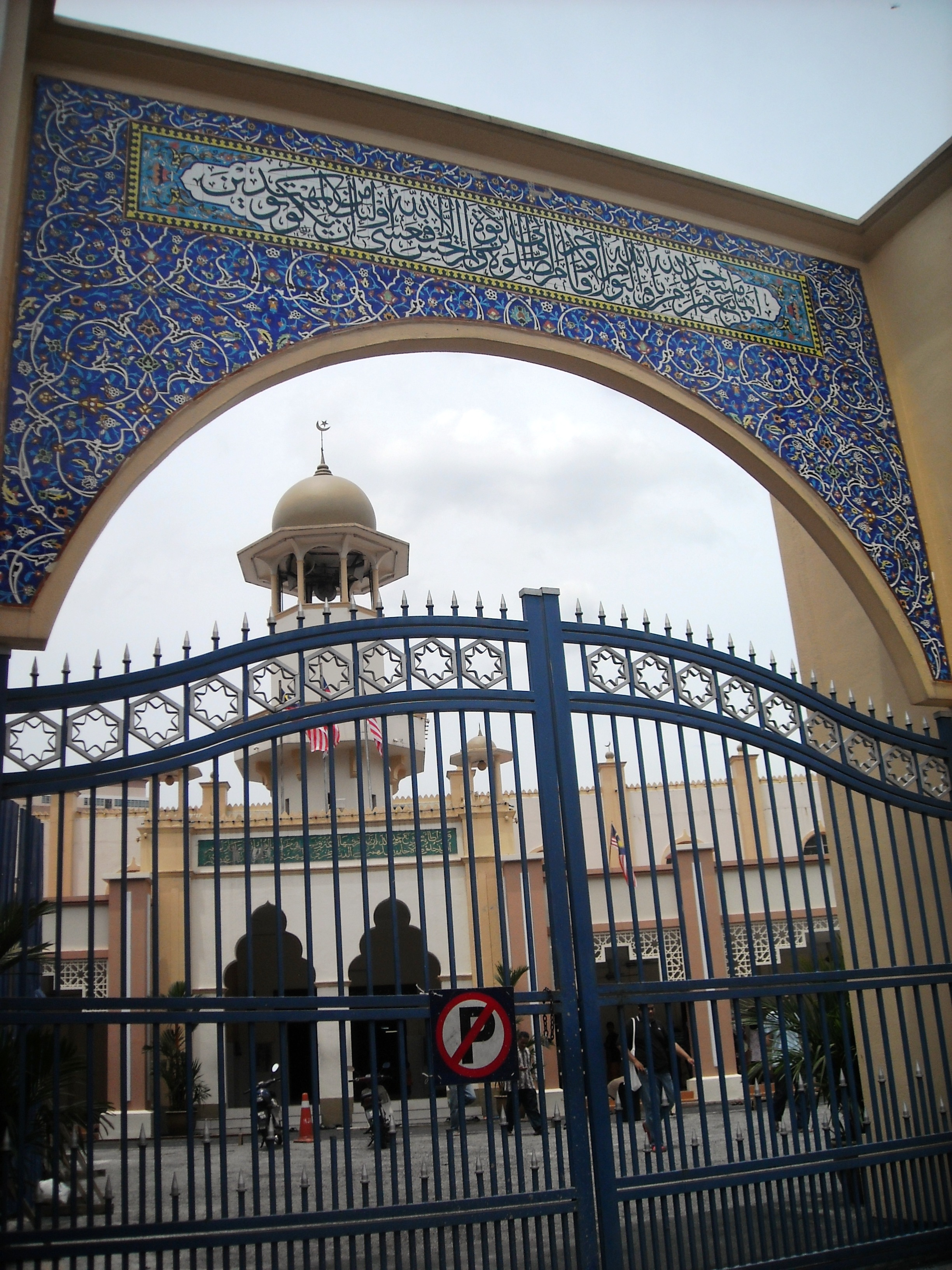
Masjid Jamek Kampung Baru

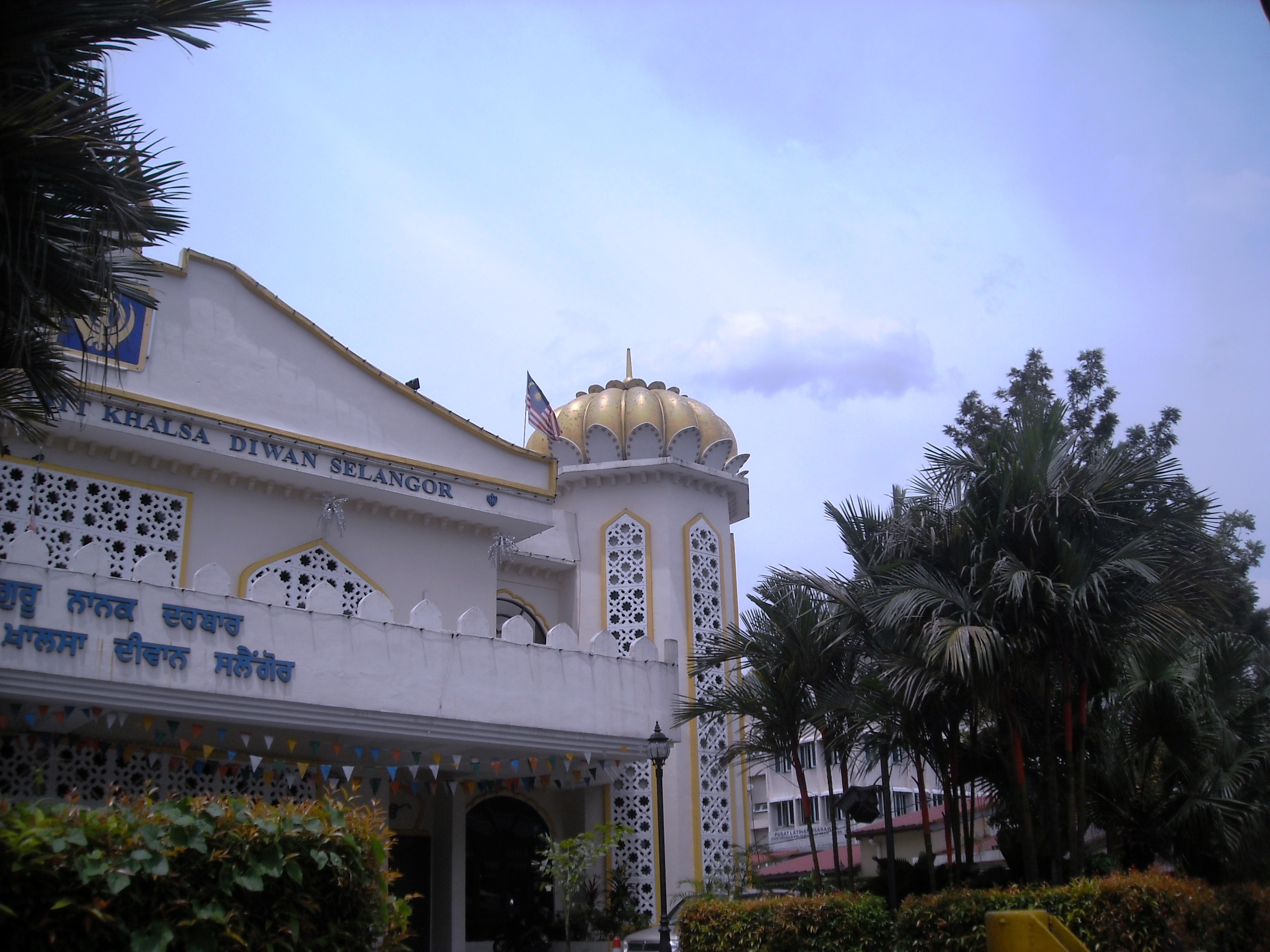
Sikh Temple, Kampung Baru

== Healthcare ==
Kampung Baru district is notable for being home to Kuala Lumpur Hospital and the National Heart Institute.

== Other landmarks ==
- Kelab Sultan Sulaiman
- Galeri Kelab Sultan Sulaiman
- National Library of Malaysia
- NAZA Group headquarters
- Masjid Jamek Kampung Baru
- Rumah Limas Kampung Baru
- Master Mat's House
- Tatt Khalsa Diwan Gurdwara
- Jalan Raja Muda Musa
- Jalan Raja Alang
- Sikh Temple
- Saloma Link

== Transport ==
Kampung Baru LRT station, served by the Rapid KL Kelana Jaya line, is located in the southern part of Kampung Baru.

Chow Kit Monorail station is located at the western end of Kampung Baru.

Raja Uda MRT station, served by the Putrajaya Line, located in the northern part of Kampung Baru.

Bus routes running through Kampung Baru include the 220 and 302.

The Saloma Link pedestrian bridge, spanning the Klang River and the Ampang-Kuala Lumpur toll road, is a shortcut from Kampung Baru to the Petronas Towers.

== Notable residents ==
- Tan Sri S.M. Salim - Malaysian singer
- Tan Sri SM Nasimuddin SM Amin - Naza Group Chairman
- Tan Sri Dato' Azman Hashim - AmBank Group Chairman
- Dato' Mohamed Azlan Hashim - Proton Ex Chairman
- Dato' Zainal Abidin Putih - Chairman CIMB Bank Bhd.
- Dato Mat Shah Safuan - businessman
- Dato Seri Drs Suleiman Mohamed - former Deputy Minister of Information, politician
- Allahyarham M Shariff - Malaysian singer
- Sheikh Hassan bin Sheikh Mubarak - businessman, trader

== See also ==
- Kampung Padang Balang
