= List of tallest buildings in Malaysia =

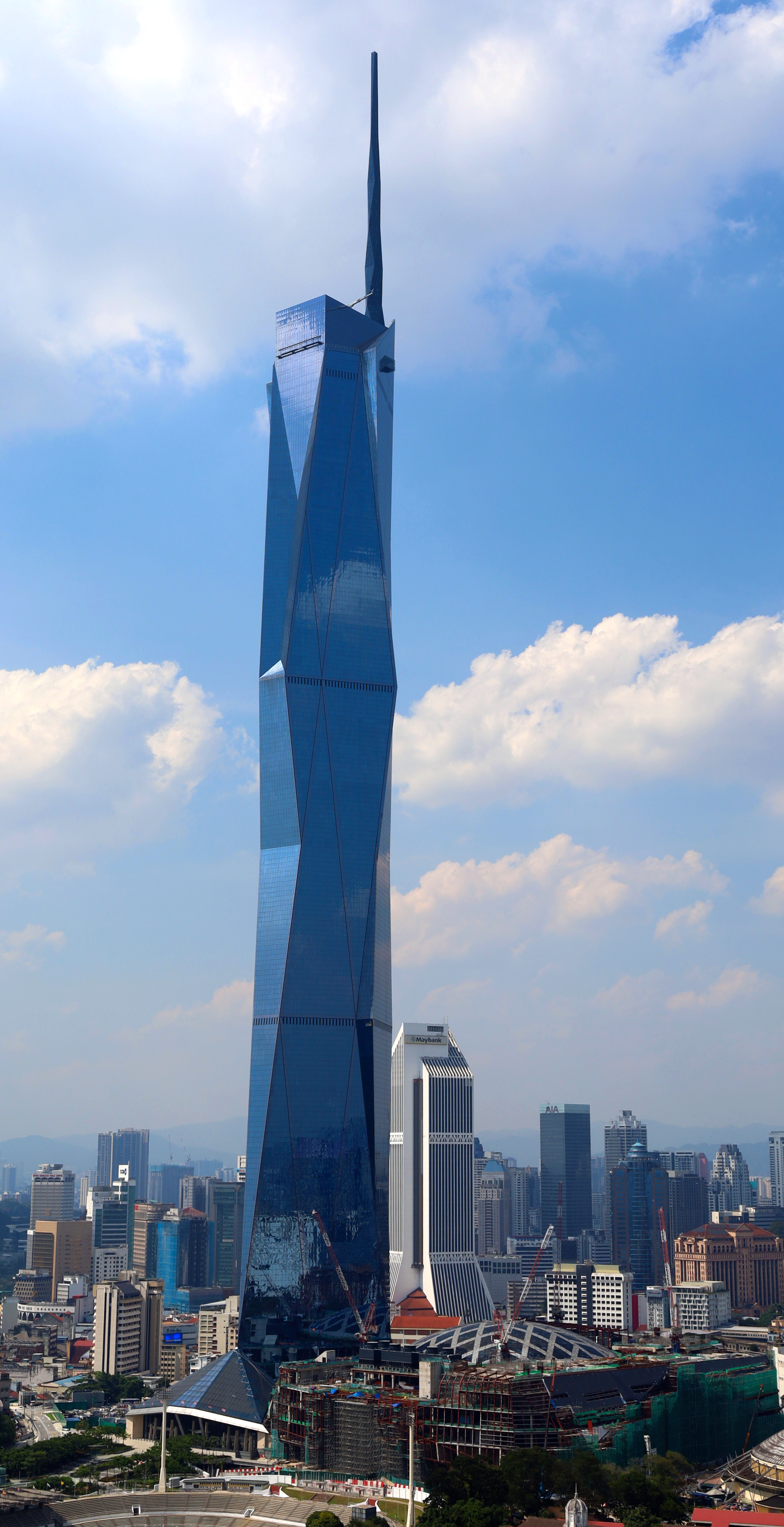
Merdeka Maybank (formerly Merdeka 118) in Kuala Lumpur is the tallest building in Malaysia, Southeast Asia, and the second tallest structure ever constructed.

Malaysia is home to one of the largest congregations of skyscrapers in the world. The country ranks fourth in the global list compiled by the Council on Tall Buildings and Urban Habitat (CTBUH), with 518 recorded structures built exceeding the height of 150 metres (492 ft). The country's first skyscraper was built in Kuala Lumpur in 1978, and since then the city has one of the tallest skylines in the world. Besides Kuala Lumpur and its surrounding metropolitan area, most Malaysian skyscrapers are built either in George Town or Johor Bahru. Since 2023, Merdeka Maybank in Kuala Lumpur has been the tallest skyscraper in Malaysia. Built with an architectural height of 678.9 metres (2,227 ft), it contains the tallest observatory installed in a spire and is currently the world's second tallest building or man-made structure.

Malaysia's history with skyscrapers originated from construction booms in Kuala Lumpur between the 1970s and 1980s, where architectural height records were constantly broken and surpassed. In 1971, the 28-storey Sime Bank Building (currently Takaful Building) was the first building to exceed 100 metres (328 ft). In 1978, the Bank Muamalat Building became the first skyscraper in the country under the definitions of the CTBUH. In 1985, the 65-storey Komtar in George Town became the first skyscraper to exceed 200 metres (656 ft) in height. The Petronas Towers, a pair of 88-storey supertall skyscrapers located in the Kuala Lumpur City Centre, were the tallest skyscrapers in the world from 1998 to 2004, and remains the tallest twin skyscrapers in the world as of 2023.

Currently, Malaysia has 419 completed structures above 150 metres (492 ft), 90 structures above 200 metres (656 ft), and eight structures above 300 metres (984 ft) in architectural height.

== List of tallest completed / topped-out structures ==
This list ranks completed and topped-out structures in Malaysia that stand at least 150 metres (492 ft) tall, based on standard height measurement which includes spires and architectural details, but excludes antenna masts. An equal sign (=) following a rank indicates the same height between two or more buildings. An approximation sign (≈) indicates an estimated height measurement from CTBUH. The "Year" column indicates the year in which a building was or will be completed.

Was or is the country's tallest building upon completion

Name of skyscraper	Height		Flr.	Year	Location		Ref.
Name of skyscraper	m	ft	Flr.	Year	City	Coordinates	Ref.
Merdeka Maybank	678.9 m	2,227 ft	118	2023	Kuala Lumpur	3.1413°N 101.7007°E	
The Exchange 106	453.6 m	1,488 ft	95	2019	Kuala Lumpur	3.1420°N 101.7187°E	
Petronas Tower 1	451.9 m	1,483 ft	88	1998	Kuala Lumpur	3.1580°N 101.7118°E	
Petronas Tower 2	451.9 m	1,483 ft	88	1998	Kuala Lumpur	3.1580°N 101.7118°E	
Kuala Lumpur Tower	421.0 m	1,381 ft	15	1994	Kuala Lumpur	3.1528°N 101.7033°E	
SO/ Sofitel Residences	345.0 m	1,132 ft	78	2025	Kuala Lumpur	3.1575°N 101.7168°E	
Four Seasons Place	342.5 m	1,124 ft	75	2018	Kuala Lumpur	3.1579°N 101.7138°E	
Telekom Tower	310.0 m	1,017 ft	55	2001	Kuala Lumpur	3.1162°N 101.6659°E	
Kempinski Hotel and Residences	307.8 m	1,010 ft	72	2024	Kuala Lumpur	3.1506°N 101.7151°E	
The Astaka Tower A	278.8 m	915 ft	72	2018	Johor Bahru	1.4733°N 103.7636°E	
8 Conlay Tower A	277.0 m	909 ft	61	2024	Kuala Lumpur	3.1506°N 101.7151°E	
RedEarth Two @ Tower A	276.0 m	906 ft	65	2027	Gohtong Jaya	3.386900°N 101.770714°E	
RedEarth Two @ Tower B	276.0 m	906 ft	65	2027	Gohtong Jaya	3.387361°N 101.770395°E	
Ilham Tower	274.0 m	899 ft	58	2016	Kuala Lumpur	3.1593°N 101.7186°E	
RedEarth One @ Tower C	272.0 m	892 ft	64	2027	Gohtong Jaya	3.387953°N 101.770239°E	
RedEarth One @ Tower D	272.0 m	892 ft	64	2027	Gohtong Jaya	3.388481°N 101.770148°E	
Bloomsvale Verbena	270.0 m	886 ft	66	2023	Kuala Lumpur	3.0761°N 101.6608°E	
Bloomsvale Vinca	270.0 m	886 ft	66	2023	Kuala Lumpur	3.0761°N 101.6608°E	
Petronas Tower 3	267.0 m	876 ft	60	2012	Kuala Lumpur	3.1567°N 101.7111°E	
Star Residences TWO	264.9 m	869 ft	58	2019	Kuala Lumpur	3.1634°N 101.7160°E	
Ascott Star	264.9 m	869 ft	58	2019	Kuala Lumpur	3.1634°N 101.7160°E	
8 Conlay Tower B	260.0 m	853 ft	56	2024	Kuala Lumpur	3.1506°N 101.7151°E	
Damansara Heights Crown Residences	260.0 m	853 ft	66	2023	Kuala Lumpur	3.1452°N 101.6632°E	
The Astaka Tower B	255.6 m	839 ft	67	2018	Johor Bahru	1.4733°N 103.7636°E	
Damansara Heights Regent Suites	253.4 m	831 ft	70	2023	Kuala Lumpur	3.1452°N 101.6632°E	
Damansara Heights Windsor Suites	253.4 m	831 ft	70	2023	Kuala Lumpur	3.1452°N 101.6632°E	
Wyndham Ion Majestic	253.0 m	830 ft	50	2023	Genting Highlands	3.4350°N 101.7874°E	
Permata Sapura Tower	252.5 m	828 ft	53	2020	Kuala Lumpur	3.1530°N 101.7137°E	
Trion BOLT Tower A	251.0 m	823 ft	66	2022	Kuala Lumpur	3.1240°N 101.7103°E	
Star Residences ONE	251.0 m	823 ft	57	2019	Kuala Lumpur	3.1634°N 101.7160°E	
Space Residency I	250.0 m	820 ft	60	2024	Johor Bahru		
Space Residency II	250.0 m	820 ft	60	2024	Johor Bahru		
Conrad Kuala Lumpur	250.0 m	820 ft	50	2023	Kuala Lumpur	3.1519°N 101.7093°E	
Komtar	248.7 m	816 ft	68	1986	George Town	5.4146°N 100.3297°E	
Maybank Tower	243.5 m	799 ft	50	1988	Kuala Lumpur	3.1473°N 101.6995°E	
Vogue Suites One	243.5 m	799 ft	63	2017	Kuala Lumpur	3.1168°N 101.6740°E	
Southpoint Tower	242.0 m	794 ft	56	2018	Kuala Lumpur	3.1161°N 101.6753°E	
Banyan Tree Signatures	240.0 m	787 ft	55	2016	Kuala Lumpur	3.1503°N 101.7138°E	
Vista Tower	238.0 m	781 ft	62	1994	Kuala Lumpur	3.1621°N 101.7234°E	
Arte Cheras Charms	235.0 m	771 ft	85	2023	Kuala Lumpur	3.1003°N 101.7357°E	
Arte Cheras Mono	235.0 m	771 ft	85	2023	Kuala Lumpur	3.1003°N 101.7357°E	
Vortex Tower	235.0 m	771 ft	58	2016	Kuala Lumpur	3.1547°N 101.7073°E	
Tropicana The Residence	235.0 m	771 ft	55	2018	Kuala Lumpur	3.1587°N 101.7094°E	
Agile Embassy Garden Tower A	234.0 m	768 ft	64	2024	Kuala Lumpur	3.1601°N 101.7221°E	
Agile Embassy Garden Tower B	234.0 m	768 ft	64	2025	Kuala Lumpur	3.1601°N 101.7221°E	
Agile Embassy Garden Tower C	234.0 m	768 ft	64	2025	Kuala Lumpur	3.1601°N 101.7221°E	
Affin Tower	233.0 m	764 ft	47	2021	Kuala Lumpur	3.1410°N 101.7194°E	
Wyndham Grand i-City	232 m	761 ft	55	2025	Shah Alam	3.063806°N 101.482488°E	
The FACE Platinum Suites	231.3 m	759 ft	57	2015	Kuala Lumpur	3.1585°N 101.7039°E	
Elite Pavilion	230.0 m	755 ft	50	2018	Kuala Lumpur	3.1481°N 101.7129°E	
Pinnacle Petaling Jaya	230.0 m	755 ft	53	2016	Petaling Jaya	3.1041°N 101.6401°E	
Sky Suites B	230.0 m	755 ft	62	2019	Kuala Lumpur	3.1558°N 101.7092°E	
Equatorial Plaza	229.7 m	754 ft	55	2018	Kuala Lumpur	3.1531°N 101.7093°E	
Imperial Lexis	227.0 m	745 ft	50	2023	Kuala Lumpur	3.1526°N 101.7161°E	
M Vertica A-B	227.0 m	745 ft	54	2023	Kuala Lumpur	3.1194°N 101.7274°E	
M Vertica D-E	227.0 m	745 ft	54	2023	Kuala Lumpur	3.1194°N 101.7274°E	
BeCentral Residence	227 m	745 ft	50	2025	Shah Alam	3.063242°N 101.481915°E	
Arte Mont Kiara Tower 2	≈225.0 m	≈738 ft	66	2020	Kuala Lumpur	3.1759°N 101.6652°E	
Marriott Residences Penang	223.5 m	732 ft	56	2023	George Town	5.4317°N 100.3178°E	
Ami Suites	≈221.0 m	≈725 ft	58	2020	Kuala Lumpur	3.1758°N 101.6649°E	
Altus	220.0 m	722 ft	60	2017	Johor Bahru	1.4769°N 103.7608°E	
Jewel by Oxley KLCC	219.6 m	720 ft	52	2025	Kuala Lumpur	3.1595°N 101.7153°E	
Sky Suites A	216.5 m	710 ft	61	2019	Kuala Lumpur	3.1559°N 101.7091°E	
The FACE Victory Suites	216.0 m	709 ft	54	2021	Kuala Lumpur	3.1583°N 101.7046°E	
Felda Tower	215.5 m	707 ft	50	2012	Kuala Lumpur	3.1555°N 101.7186°E	
Naza Tower 1	215.5 m	707 ft	50	2015	Kuala Lumpur	3.1547°N 101.7186°E	
Lucentia Residences	215.1 m	706 ft	55	2022	Kuala Lumpur	3.1391°N 101.7086°E	
The Luxe by Inifinitium	215.0 m	705 ft	56	2021	Kuala Lumpur	3.1609°N 101.7014°E	
Nube	214.5 m	704 ft	55	2017	Johor Bahru	1.4769°N 103.7608°E	
Sora	214.5 m	704 ft	55	2017	Johor Bahru	1.4769°N 103.7608°E	
Bay Laurel Tower 1	214.0 m	617 ft	55	2017	Johor Bahru		
Royal Strand Tower 3	214.0 m	702 ft	55	2017	Johor Bahru	1.4669°N 103.7255°E	
Sky Suites C	212.3 m	697 ft	61	2019	Kuala Lumpur	3.1559°N 101.7091°E	
Maxis Tower	212.0 m	696 ft	49	1998	Kuala Lumpur	3.1582°N 101.7129°E	
Tri Tower Residences 1	210.6 m	691 ft	55	2019	Johor Bahru	1.4674°N 103.7649°E	
Tri Tower Residences 2	210.6 m	691 ft	55	2019	Johor Bahru	1.4674°N 103.7649°E	
The Sentral Residences Tower A	210.4 m	690 ft	58	2017	Kuala Lumpur	3.1367°N 101.6894°E	
The Sentral Residences Tower B	210.4 m	690 ft	58	2017	Kuala Lumpur	3.1367°N 101.6894°E	
AmBank Tower	210.0 m	689 ft	50	1998	Kuala Lumpur	3.1612°N 101.7110°E	
Aspire Tower	≈210.0 m	≈689 ft	48	2023	Kuala Lumpur	3.1179°N 101.6739°E	
Mercure Hotel @ Trion	209.0 m	686 ft	56	2023	Kuala Lumpur	3.1244°N 101.7100°E	
TSLAW Tower	≈209.0 m	≈686 ft	48	2021	Kuala Lumpur	3.1444°N 101.7195°E	
The Stride	≈209.0 m	≈686 ft	48	2022	Kuala Lumpur	3.1395°N 101.7096°E	
The Manor	208.0 m	682 ft	50	2021	Kuala Lumpur	3.1527°N 101.7197°E	
Sunway Belfield Tower A	205.9 m	676 ft	56	2024	Kuala Lumpur	3.1362°N 101.6982°E	
Sunway Belfield Tower B	205.9 m	676 ft	56	2024	Kuala Lumpur	3.1362°N 101.6982°E	
Sunway Belfield Tower C	205.9 m	676 ft	56	2024	Kuala Lumpur	3.1362°N 101.6982°E	
Muze Block B	205.5 m	674 ft	58	2022	George Town	5.3304°N 100.2851°E	
Arte Mont Kiara Tower 3	≈205.0 m	≈673 ft	60	2020	Kuala Lumpur	3.1758°N 101.6652°E	
Q Sentral	205.0 m	673 ft	49	2015	Kuala Lumpur	3.1365°N 101.6877°E	
St. Regis Hotel & Residences	205.0 m	673 ft	48	2016	Kuala Lumpur	3.1368°N 101.6887°E	
The Troika Tower 3	204.0 m	669 ft	50	2010	Kuala Lumpur	3.1582°N 101.7177°E	
Eaton Residences	203.1 m	666 ft	52	2021	Kuala Lumpur	3.1513°N 101.7199°E	
Berjaya Times Square Tower A	203.1 m	666 ft	48	2003	Kuala Lumpur	3.1422°N 101.7105°E	
Berjaya Times Square Tower B	203.1 m	666 ft	48	2003	Kuala Lumpur	3.1422°N 101.7105°E	
K Residence	202.0 m	663 ft	52	2008	Kuala Lumpur	3.1596°N 101.7131°E	
Le Nouvel Tower 1	201.0 m	659 ft	49	2016	Kuala Lumpur	3.1594°N 101.7126°E	
Agile Bukit Bintang Tower C	200.0 m	656 ft	60	2023	Kuala Lumpur	3.1470°N 101.7195°E	
Bangkok Bank Tower	200.0 m	656 ft	46	2015	Kuala Lumpur	3.1562°N 101.7053°E	
The Ritz Carlton Residences	200.0 m	656 ft	48	2016	Kuala Lumpur	3.1566°N 101.7058°E	
Lot G Office Towers	200.0 m	656 ft	45	2013	Kuala Lumpur	3.1324°N 101.6865°E	
Multi Purpose Tower	198.2 m	650 ft	40	1994	Kuala Lumpur	3.1556°N 101.6989°E	
Capital Square Tower 2	198.2 m	650 ft	41	2011	Kuala Lumpur	3.1542°N 101.6989°E	
Carnelian Tower 1	≈196.0 m	≈643 ft	45	2016	Iskandar Puteri	1.3339°N 103.5901°E	
Maju Perdana One	196.0 m	643 ft	50	2002	Kuala Lumpur	3.1594°N 101.6962°E	
Standard Chartered Tower	196.0 m	643 ft	43	1990	Kuala Lumpur	3.1497°N 101.7114°E	
Tri Tower Capri by Fraser	≈194.0 m	≈636 ft	52	2018	Johor Bahru	1.4668°N 103.7651°E	
UOB Tower 2	193.5 m	635 ft	29	2021	Kuala Lumpur	3.1514°N 101.6959°E	
Sunway Serene Tower 1	193.0 m	633 ft	56	2023	Petaling Jaya	3.0903°N 101.6064°E	
Sunway Serene Tower 2	193.0 m	633 ft	56	2023	Petaling Jaya	3.0903°N 101.6064°E	
Jesselton Twin Tower A	210.5 m	630 ft	56	2023	Kota Kinabalu	5.9662°N 116.0979°E	
Jesselton Twin Tower B	210.5 m	630 ft	56	2023	Kota Kinabalu	5.9662°N 116.0979°E	
Citibank Tower	190 m	624 ft	50	1995	Kuala Lumpur	3.1600°N 101.7172°E	
Silverscape Residences	190.1 m	624 ft	49	2017	Malacca City	2.1826°N 102.2630°E	
Kuantan 188	188.1 m	617 ft	6	2020	Kuantan		
KL Gateway Corporate Office Tower 1	≈188.0 m	≈617 ft	43	2017	Kuala Lumpur	3.1146°N 101.6633°E	
MET 1 Residences	≈188.0 m	≈617 ft	55	2022	Kuala Lumpur	3.1755°N 101.6699°E	
Royal Strand Tower 3	≈188.0 m	≈617 ft	55	2017	Johor Bahru	1.4660°N 103.7258°E	
Tri Tower Residential Tower B	≈188.0 m	≈617 ft	55	2018	Johor Bahru	1.4676°N 103.7649°E	
Green Haven Service Apartment A	187.0 m	613 ft	47	2018	Johor Bahru		
Arte S Tower 1	186.0 m	610 ft	51	2018	George Town	5.3593°N 100.2925°E	
Marinara Financial Center	185.7 m	609 ft	36	2000	Kuala Lumpur	3.1623°N 101.7196°E	
Aria Residence 2	184.0 m	604 ft	45	2019	Kuala Lumpur	3.1539°N 101.7222°E	
Grand Seasons Hotel	184.0 m	604 ft	46	1998	Kuala Lumpur	3.1701°N 101.6980°E	
The MET Corporate Tower A	≈183.0 m	≈600 ft	42	2022	Kuala Lumpur	3.1812°N 101.6648°E	
Integra Tower @ The Intermark	≈181.0 m	≈594 ft	40	2013	Kuala Lumpur	3.1610°N 101.7203°E	
The Landmark	≈179.0 m	≈587 ft	41	2017	George Town	5.4483°N 100.3058°E	
Public Mutual Tower	179.0 m	587 ft	42	2016	Kuala Lumpur	3.1510°N 101.7075°E	
YTL HQ Tower	179.0 m	587 ft	42	2020	Kuala Lumpur	3.1481°N 101.7158°E	
Capri by Fraser Bukit Bintang	177.5 m	582 ft	44	2021	Kuala Lumpur	3.1465°N 101.7153°E	
The Troika Tower 2	177.0 m	581 ft	44	2010	Kuala Lumpur	3.1582°N 101.7177°E	
Soho Suites @ KLCC	≈175.0 m	≈574 ft	45	2014	Kuala Lumpur	3.1538°N 101.7099°E	
Dato' Onn Tower	175.0 m	574 ft	40	1985	Kuala Lumpur	3.1690°N 101.6913°E	
The Vertical Corporate Tower 1	≈175.0 m	≈574 ft	40	2017	Kuala Lumpur	3.1109°N 101.6658°E	
The Vertical Corporate Tower 2	≈175.0 m	≈574 ft	40	2017	Kuala Lumpur	3.1120°N 101.6662°E	
KKR2 Tower	174.4 m	572 ft	37	2014	Kuala Lumpur	3.1552°N 101.6891°E	
Bay Laurel Tower 2	≈174.0 m	≈571 ft	51	2017	Johor Bahru	1.4627°N 103.7283°E	
Gurney Beach Resort Condominium	≈172.0 m	≈564 ft	39	1999	George Town	5.4305°N 100.3184°E	
PNB Perdana Hotel & Suites	≈172.0 m	≈564 ft	39	2000	Kuala Lumpur	3.1581°N 101.7186°E	
Menara PNB	171.0 m	561 ft	45	1985	Kuala Lumpur	3.1575°N 101.7199°E	
Skyawani 3 Residences	170.55 m	560 ft	52	2021	Kuala Lumpur		
Kings Bay Tower 1	≈170.0 m	≈558 ft	50	2017	Johor Bahru	1.4625°N 103.7289°E	
Menara Jland	170.0 m	558 ft	38	2018	Johor Bahru	1.4646°N 103.7624°E	
Courtyard By Marriott	170.0 m	558 ft	36	2023	Kuala Lumpur	3.0755°N 101.6605°E	
Menara Public Bank	170.0 m	558 ft	36	1994	Kuala Lumpur	3.1601°N 101.7100°E	
Wisma Goldhill	168.1 m	552 ft	37	1993	Kuala Lumpur	3.1502°N 101.7084°E	
Green Haven Service Apartment C	168.0 m	551 ft	42	2018	Johor Bahru		
CAHB Corporate Office Tower	168.0 m	551 ft	42	2008	Kuala Lumpur	3.1552°N 101.6951°E	
Menara Prestige	168.0 m	551 ft	40	2011	Kuala Lumpur	3.1564°N 101.7098°E	
Plaza Cygal	168.0 m	551 ft	40	2000	Kuala Lumpur	3.1159°N 101.6635°E	
I-Santorini Tower C	167.0 m	548 ft	49	2019	George Town	5.4557°N 100.3087°E	
Green Haven Service Apartment B	167.0 m	547 ft	45	2018	Johor Bahru		
R&F Princess Cove Phase 2 Tower 3	≈167.0 m	≈548 ft	49	2022	Johor Bahru	1.4575°N 103.7711°E	
The Lovell	≈167.0 m	≈548 ft	49	2017	Johor Bahru	1.4661°N 103.7290°E	
BBCC Phase 2 Office Tower	167.0 m	548 ft	45	2023	Kuala Lumpur	3.1393°N 101.7086°E	
LTH Tower	≈166.0 m	≈545 ft	38	2015	Kuala Lumpur	3.1552°N 101.7187°E	
KL Gateway Corporate Office Tower 2	≈166.0 m	≈545 ft	38	2017	Kuala Lumpur	3.1136°N 101.6629°E	
Menara Kembar Bank Rakyat 1	≈166.0 m	≈545 ft	38	2014	Kuala Lumpur	3.1303°N 101.6826°E	
Menara Etiqa	≈166.0 m	≈545 ft	38	2018	Kuala Lumpur	3.1269°N 101.6781°E	
Alor Setar Tower	165.5 m	543 ft	5	1996	Alor Setar		
Southern Marina Tower 1	164.0m	538 ft	41	2019	Johor bahru		
Setia V Residences Tower A	≈164.0 m	≈538 ft	48	2017	George Town	5.4331°N 100.3150°E	
I-Santorini Tower A	≈164.0 m	≈538 ft	48	2019	George Town	5.4545°N 100.3082°E	
I-Santorini Tower B	≈164.0 m	≈538 ft	48	2019	George Town	5.4552°N 100.3084°E	
Grand Hyatt Hotel	≈164.0 m	≈538 ft	43	2012	Kuala Lumpur	3.1538°N 101.7122°E	
Razak City Residences Tower C1	≈164.0 m	≈538 ft	48	2022	Kuala Lumpur	3.1085°N 101.7058°E	
Sky Suites @ KLCC D	≈164.0 m	≈538 ft	43	2019	Kuala Lumpur	3.1559°N 101.7091°E	
Menara CIMB	162.3 m	532 ft	34	2013	Kuala Lumpur	3.1366°N 101.6864°E	
Bangunan Dewan Bahasa & Pustaka	≈162.3 m	≈532 ft	37	2013	Kuala Lumpur	3.1344°N 101.7034°E	
Menara Keck Seng	162.0 m	531 ft	39	1997	Kuala Lumpur	3.1480°N 101.7151°E	
Menara Shell	≈162.0 m	≈531 ft	37	2013	Kuala Lumpur	3.1307°N 101.6848°E	
Sentral Suites Tower 2	162.0 m	531 ft	44	2022	Kuala Lumpur	3.1290°N 101.6859°E	
Menara JKG	161.2 m	529 ft	31	2016	Kuala Lumpur	3.1619°N 101.6958°E	
The Latitude A	≈161.0 m	≈528 ft	43	2015	George Town	5.4499°N 100.2984°E	
The Latitude B	≈161.0 m	≈528 ft	43	2015	George Town	5.4499°N 100.2985°E	
Menara Landmark	161.0 m	528 ft	35	1998	Johor Bahru	1.4652°N 103.7599°E	
Le Nouvel Tower 2	≈161.0 m	≈528 ft	43	2016	Kuala Lumpur	3.1595°N 101.7126°E	
United Point Residence Tower B	≈161.0 m	≈528 ft	45	2020	Kuala Lumpur	3.1921°N 101.6541°E	
3 Residence Tower A	≈160.0 m	≈525 ft	47	2021	George Town	5.3986°N 100.3281°E	
3 Residence Tower B	≈160.0 m	≈525 ft	47	2021	George Town	5.3985°N 100.3275°E	
Amberside Tower 2	≈160.0 m	≈525 ft	47	2017	Johor Bahru	1.4659°N 103.7269°E	
Alila Bangsar	≈160.0 m	≈525 ft	42	2018	Kuala Lumpur	3.1279°N 101.6805°E	
The Troika Tower 1	160.0 m	525 ft	38	2010	Kuala Lumpur	3.1582°N 101.7177°E	
ARIKA Kubang Kerian	159.65 m	523.79 ft	42	2026	Kubang Kerian		
Mesahill Premier	158.3 m	520 ft	46	2023	Nilai		
Angkupuri	158.2 m	519 ft	39	1999	Kuala Lumpur	3.1702°N 101.6523°E	
The Rise Collection, South Tower	≈157.0 m	≈515 ft	46	2019	George Town	5.4097°N 100.3257°E	
Amberside Tower 2	≈157.0 m	≈515 ft	47	2017	Johor Bahru	1.4658°N 103.7272°E	
Johor Bahru City Square	≈157.0 m	≈515 ft	36	1999	Johor Bahru	1.4624°N 103.7635°E	
Cendana Condominium	≈157.0 m	≈515 ft	42	2008	Kuala Lumpur	3.1584°N 101.7053°E	
Inspirasi Mont' Kiara Block B	≈157.0 m	≈515 ft	46	2022	Kuala Lumpur	3.1718°N 101.6509°E	
KL Gateway Premium Residences	≈157.0 m	≈515 ft	46	2019	Kuala Lumpur	3.1138°N 101.6640°E	
Dayabumi Complex	157.0 m	515 ft	36	1984	Kuala Lumpur	3.1450°N 101.6939°E	
The Estate Tower 1	≈157.0 m	≈515 ft	46	2021	Kuala Lumpur	3.1113°N 101.6610°E	
The Park Sky Residence Tower C	≈157.0 m	≈515 ft	46	2020	Kuala Lumpur	3.0528°N 101.6723°E	
Gurney Paragon East Tower	155.0 m	509 ft	43	2011	George Town	5.4362°N 100.3121°E	
Gurney Paragon West Tower	155.0 m	509 ft	43	2011	George Town	5.4368°N 100.3115°E	
Dynasty Hotel	154.5 m	507 ft	37	1994	Kuala Lumpur	3.1721°N 101.6918°E	
1 Sentrum	154.0 m	505 ft	35	2013	Kuala Lumpur	3.1338°N 101.6882°E	
Hilton Kuala Lumpur	154.0 m	505 ft	37	2004	Kuala Lumpur	3.1354°N 101.6859°E	
Menara MAIWP	≈154.0 m	≈505 ft	34	2011	Kuala Lumpur	3.1669°N 101.7010°E	
Pavilion Residences Tower 1	154.0 m	505 ft	47	2009	Kuala Lumpur	3.1494°N 101.7137°E	
Sunway Avila Tower 2	154.0 m	505 ft	46	2023	Kuala Lumpur	3.1929°N 101.7377°E	
Wisma UOA II	≈154.0 m	≈505 ft	34	1998	Kuala Lumpur	3.1525°N 101.7123°E	
Imperial Grande A	≈153.0 m	≈502 ft	45	2020	George Town	5.3369°N 100.2720°E	
Imperial Grande B	≈153.0 m	≈502 ft	45	2020	George Town	5.3365°N 100.2730°E	
Jazz Residence	≈153.0 m	≈502 ft	45	2017	George Town	5.4582°N 100.3102°E	
One Tanjong 1	≈153.0 m	≈502 ft	41	2013	George Town	5.4657°N 100.2933°E	
One Tanjong 2	≈153.0 m	≈502 ft	41	2013	George Town	5.4667°N 100.2939°E	
Tri Pinnacle A	≈153.0 m	≈502 ft	45	2018	George Town	5.4494°N 100.2960°E	
Tri Pinnacle B	≈153.0 m	≈502 ft	45	2018	George Town	5.4492°N 100.2955°E	
Tri Pinnacle C	≈153.0 m	≈502 ft	45	2018	George Town	5.4490°N 100.2951°E	
Strata Office Suites	≈153.0 m	≈502 ft	35	2018	Kuala Lumpur	3.1204°N 101.6746°E	
The Binjai on the Park 2	≈153.0 m	≈502 ft	45	2008	Kuala Lumpur	3.1547°N 101.7178°E	
The Henge Kepong (Tower D)	≈153.0 m	≈502 ft	45	2019	Kuala Lumpur	3.2208°N 101.6413°E	
Meridin@The Medini A	152.0m	499 ft	39	2017	Johor Bahru		
Pinnacle Tower A	152.0m	499 ft	38	2017	Johor Bahru		
Tropez Residences Tower B	152.0m	499 ft	38	2015	Johor Bahru		
Tropez Residences Tower A	152.0m	499 ft	38	2015	Johor Bahru		
KH Tower	152.0 m	499 ft	36	1983	Kuala Lumpur	3.1512°N 101.7100°E	
Sheraton Imperial Kuala Lumpur Hotel	152.0 m	499 ft	38	1997	Kuala Lumpur	3.1587°N 101.7000°E	
One Foresta Block 1	≈151.0 m	≈495 ft	42	2019	George Town	5.2994°N 100.2569°E	
One Foresta Block 2	≈151.0 m	≈495 ft	42	2019	George Town	5.2995°N 100.2576°E	
One Foresta Block 3	≈151.0 m	≈495 ft	42	2019	George Town	5.3001°N 100.2586°E	
One Foresta Block 4	≈151.0 m	≈495 ft	42	2019	George Town	5.3012°N 100.2587°E	
Bangunan MAS	151.0 m	495 ft	36	1985	Kuala Lumpur	3.1520°N 101.7093°E	
Menara Binjai	151.0 m	495 ft	34	2012	Kuala Lumpur	3.1588°N 101.7186°E	
Menara TA One	151.0 m	495 ft	37	1996	Kuala Lumpur	3.1565°N 101.7097°E	
Parkview Serviced Apartments	151.0 m	495 ft	43	2007	Kuala Lumpur	3.1562°N 101.7085°E	
Bank Muamalat Tower	150.5 m	494 ft	30	1978	Kuala Lumpur	3.1504°N 101.6971°E	
Menara IQ @ TRX	150.4 m	493 ft	34	2021	Kuala Lumpur	3.1407°N 101.7193°E	
City of Dreams Tower 1	≈150.0 m	≈492 ft	40	2021	George Town	5.4461°N 100.3106°E	
City of Dreams Tower 2	≈150.0 m	≈492 ft	40	2021	George Town	5.4452°N 100.3094°E	
Grace Residence	≈150.0 m	≈492 ft	44	2016	George Town	5.3898°N 100.3171°E	
Novus Residences	≈150.0 m	≈492 ft	44	2020	George Town	5.3322°N 100.2987°E	
Skyridge Garden Tower A	≈150.0 m	≈492 ft	40	2019	George Town	5.4497°N 100.2983°E	
Skyridge Garden Tower B	≈150.0 m	≈492 ft	40	2019	George Town	5.4498°N 100.2986°E	
Skyview Residence	≈150.0 m	≈492 ft	43	2018	George Town	5.2821°N 100.2739°E	
Elysia Park Residence Block 3	≈150.0 m	≈492 ft	44	2019	Iskandar Puteri	1.4254°N 103.6380°E	
Kings Bay Tower 2	≈150.0 m	≈492 ft	44	2017	Johor Bahru	1.4624°N 103.7282°E	
Arte Plus Tower 1	≈150.0 m	≈492 ft	44	2018	Kuala Lumpur	3.1614°N 101.7476°E	
Crest Residence	≈150.0 m	≈492 ft	44	2010	Kuala Lumpur	3.1590°N 101.7053°E	
The Binjai on the Park 1	≈150.0 m	≈492 ft	44	2008	Kuala Lumpur	3.1547°N 101.7178°E	
The Fennel Sentul East Block B	150.0 m	492 ft	42	2017	Kuala Lumpur	3.1830°N 101.6938°E	
Tribeca Residence	150.0 m	492 ft	37	2017	Kuala Lumpur	3.1464°N 101.7157°E	
Verticas Residensi B	150.0 m	492 ft	43	2013	Kuala Lumpur	3.1478°N 101.7051°E	
ViiA Residences	150.0 m	492 ft	40	2020	Kuala Lumpur	3.1178°N 101.6739°E	

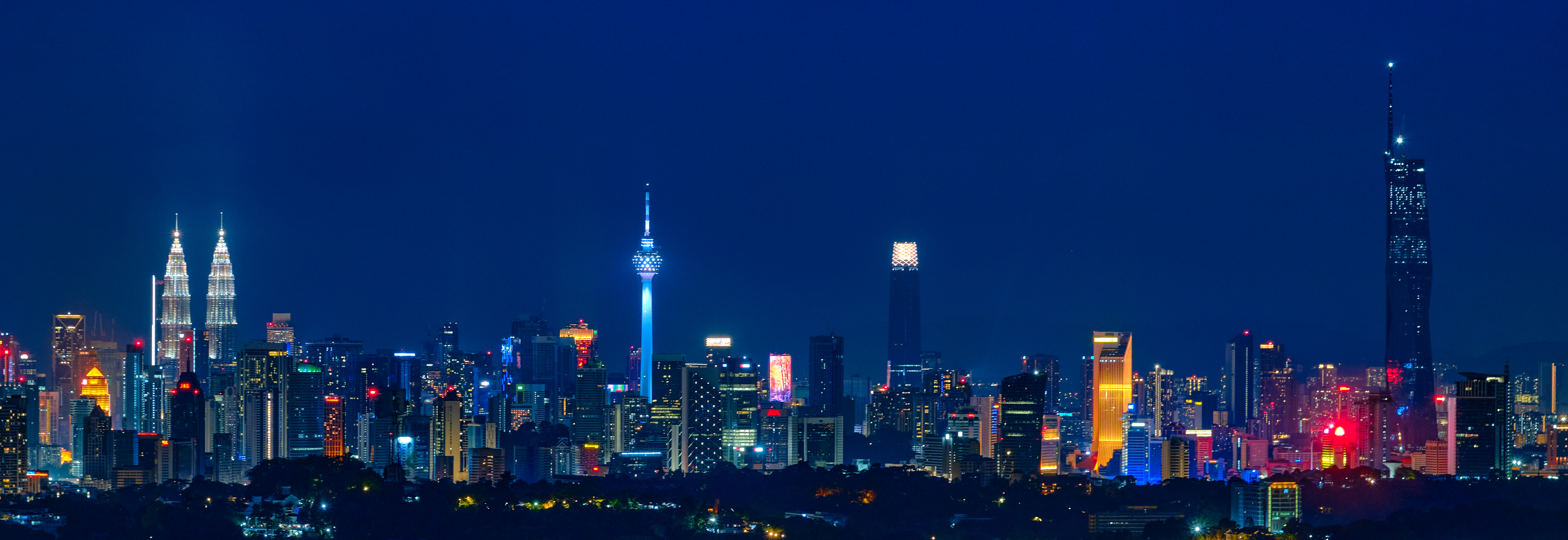
Kuala Lumpur panorama with the five tallest structures

== List of tallest buildings under construction, approved or proposed ==
=== Under construction ===
Name of skyscraper	Height		Flr.	Year	Location		Ref.
Name of skyscraper	m	ft	Flr.	Year	City	Coordinates	Ref.
IBN Bukit Bintang	330.0 m	1,083 ft	68	2028	Kuala Lumpur	3.1470°N 101.7105°E	
Divine KLCC	316.0 m	1,037 ft	84	2032	Kuala Lumpur		
Dawn KLCC	261.9 m	859 ft	69	2029	Kuala Lumpur		
Arden	260.0 m	853 ft	68	2030	Johor Bahru	1.470°N 103.76°E	
Damansara Heights Crown Residences	260.0 m	853 ft	66	2024	Kuala Lumpur	3.1452°N 101.6632°E	
Damansara Heights Regent Suites	253.4 m	831 ft	70	2024	Kuala Lumpur	3.1452°N 101.6632°E	
Damansara Heights Windsor Suites	253.4 m	831 ft	70	2024	Kuala Lumpur	3.1452°N 101.6632°E	
The Westin Residences Penang	≈240.0 m	≈787 ft	69	2028	George Town		
Agile Embassy Garden Tower A	234.0 m	768 ft	64	2025	Kuala Lumpur	3.1601°N 101.7221°E	
Agile Embassy Garden Tower B	234.0 m	768 ft	64	2025	Kuala Lumpur	3.1601°N 101.7221°E	
Agile Embassy Garden Tower C	234.0 m	768 ft	64	2025	Kuala Lumpur	3.1601°N 101.7221°E	
Harrods Hotel & Residences	220.0 m	722 ft	55	–	Kuala Lumpur	–	
Runnymede Bay	≈210.0 m	≈689 ft	48	–	George Town	5.4243°N 100.3296°E	
TwinPines Serviced Suites - A	≈210.0 m	≈689 ft	56	2028	Gohtong Jaya	-	
TwinPines Serviced Suites - B	≈206.5 m	≈677 ft	55	2028	Gohtong Jaya	-	

=== Proposed ===
Name of skyscraper	Height		Flr.	Year	Location		Ref.
Name of skyscraper	m	ft	Flr.	Year	City	Coordinates	Ref.
Tradewinds Square	775 m	2,542 ft	150	–	Kuala Lumpur	–	
Jewel	381.0 m	1,250 ft	73	2025	Shah Alam	–	
Coronation Square Tower 1	370.0 m	1,214 ft	78	2028	Johor Bahru	–	
Fairmont Square Tower 1	370.0 m	1,214 ft	78	–	Kuala Lumpur	–	
Hotel Fortuna	325.0 m	1,066 ft	68	–	Kuala Lumpur	–	
M101 Skywheel	316.6 m	1,039 ft	79	–	Kuala Lumpur	–	
R&F Tower 1	307.4 m	1,009 ft	79	–	Johor Bahru	–	
KL Vertical City`	≈300.0 m	≈689 ft	74	–	Kuala Lumpur	–	
Dayabumi	290.5 m	953 ft	60	–	Kuala Lumpur	–	
Tradewinds Square Tower B	288.0 m	945 ft	61	–	Kuala Lumpur	–	

== Timeline of tallest buildings ==
This lists commercial buildings that once held the title of tallest building in Malaysia. As of 2026, the title of tallest building in Malaysia is held by Merdeka 118, the second-tallest building and structure in the world, behind the Burj Khalifa in Dubai, UAE.

Buildings with this sign (*) indicate that they have been demolished.

Name	Image	City	Years as Tallest	Years	Architectural height m (ft)	Roof height m (ft)	Floors	Coordinates	Notes
Sultan Abdul Samad Building		Kuala Lumpur	1897–1942	45 years	40 (131)		3	3°08′55.2″N 101°41′39.8″E	Formerly known simply as Government Offices in its early years
Sultan Ibrahim Building		Johor Bahru	1942–1960	18 years	60 (196)		5	1°27′28.2″N 103°45′40.3″E	
Lee Yan Lian Building		Kuala Lumpur	1960–1963	3 years	73 (239)		18	3°08′52.4″N 101°41′52.7″E	The first high-rise building
Malaysian Houses of Parliament		Kuala Lumpur	1963–1971	8 years	77 (252)		20	3°08′57.8″N 101°40′45.8″E	The first high-rise building, which was built after independence
Takaful Tower		Kuala Lumpur	1971–1973	2 years	110 (361)		28	3°08′21.5″N 101°41′45.5″E	Formerly known as Bangunan Sime Bank. The first high-rise building over 100 m (328 ft)
Crowne Plaza Mutiara KL*		Kuala Lumpur	1973–1978	5 years	130 (427)		36	3°09′05.8″N 101°42′39.3″E	Formerly known as KL Hilton. Demolished in 2013
Bumiputra Commerce Tower		Kuala Lumpur	1978–1980	2 years	150.5 (493)		34	3°09′01.7″N 101°41′49.1″E	Also known as Menara Bank Muamalat. The first skyscraper in Malaysia
DBKL Tower 1		Kuala Lumpur	1980–1983	3 years	151 (495)		35	3°09′07.7″N 101°41′38.7″E	Also known as Menara DBKL 1
KH Tower		Kuala Lumpur	1983–1984	1 year	152 (499)		36	3°09′04.4″N 101°42′35.7″E	Formerly known as Promet Tower, also the first all-glass curtain wall building in Malaysia.
Dayabumi Complex		Kuala Lumpur	1984–1985	1 year	157 (515)		35	3°08′41.8″N 101°41′37.7″E	
Dato' Onn Tower		Kuala Lumpur	1985–1986	1 year	175 (574)		40	3°10′09.5″N 101°41′27.2″E	
Komtar		George Town	1985–1988	3 years	231.7 (760)		65	5°24′52.1″N 100°19′46.1″E	Second tallest in Asia when topped out. In 2016, 3 more floors were added, raising its height to 248.7 metres.
Maybank Tower		Kuala Lumpur	1988–1998	10 years	243.5 m (799 ft)		55	3°08′50.3″N 101°41′58.3″E	The first skyscraper exceeding 200 m in Kuala Lumpur (656 ft)
Petronas Twin Towers		Kuala Lumpur	1998–2019	21 years	451.9 m (1,483 ft)	405.9 m (1,332 ft)	88	3°09′28″N 101°42′42.9″E	The tallest building in the world from 1998 to 2004 and remain the tallest twin towers in the world
The Exchange 106		Kuala Lumpur	2019–2023	4 years	453.6 m (1,488 ft)		95		
Merdeka Maybank		Kuala Lumpur	2023–present	3 years	678.9 m (2,227 ft)	518.9 m (1,702 ft)	118	3.141335°N 101.700659°E	The second-tallest building in the world and tallest in Southeast Asia, The first skyscraper exceeding 500 m and 600 m in Kuala Lumpur and Malaysia.

== List of cities with the most skyscrapers ==
This is a list of the 10 cities and towns with the highest number of completed or topped out skyscrapers exceeding 300m, 200m and 150m in height respectively, according to the Council on Tall Buildings and Urban Habitat (CTBUH).

Rank	State/Federal territory	City	Image	300m+	200m+	150m+
1	Kuala Lumpur	Kuala Lumpur		7	77	204
2	Penang	George Town			4	38
3	Johor	Johor Bahru			5	35
4	Selangor	Petaling Jaya			2	14
5	Selangor	Ampang Jaya				14
6	Pahang	Bentong			5	6
7	Selangor	Shah Alam			3	10
8	Malacca	Malacca				5
9	Selangor	Sepang				5
10	Selangor	Subang Jaya				4

== List of tallest buildings by state and federal territories ==
State / Federal territory	Name	Image	Height (m & ft)	Floors	Status	Started	Completion	Location	Notes
Johor	The Astaka Tower A		278.8 m (915 ft)	72	Completed	2014	2017	Johor Bahru	Tallest building in Malaysia outside Kuala Lumpur
Kedah	Assana Serviced Suites		129 m (423 ft)	39	Completed	2023	2026	Langkawi	Part of the Tropicana Cenang development
Kelantan	ARIKA Kubang Kerian		160 m (520 ft)	42	Completed	2023	2026	Kubang Kerian	Kelantan's first skyscraper, current tallest building and structure
Malacca	Silverscape Residences		195 m (640 ft)	45	Completed	2014	2017	Malacca City	-
Negeri Sembilan	Mesahill Premier		168 m (551 ft)	45	Completed	2021	2023	Nilai	Negeri Sembilan's first skyscraper
Pahang	RedEarth Two		276 m (906 ft)	65	Topped-out	2024	2027	Gohtong Jaya	Malaysia's second tallest apartment complex
Penang	KOMTAR Tower		248.7 m (816 ft)	68	Completed	1974	1985	George Town	First building to surpass 200 m (660 ft) in Malaysia
Perak	The Venus Residence		111 m (364 ft)	35	Completed	2017	2019	Seri Manjung	-
Perlis	MAIPs Complex		54 m (177 ft)	16	Topped-out	2021	2027	Kangar	-
Sabah	Jesselton Twin Towers		192.15 m (630.4 ft)	56	Completed	2019	2023	Kota Kinabalu	The tallest building in Kota Kinabalu and Borneo Island
Sarawak	Wisma Sanyan		126 m (413 ft)	28	Completed	1996	2001	Sibu	-
Selangor	Pinnacle Petaling Jaya		230 m (750 ft)	38	Completed	2014	2016	Petaling Jaya	Tallest building and structure in Selangor
Terengganu	MBKT Tower		132 m (433 ft)	30	Completed	2014	2021	Kuala Terengganu	Kuala Terengganu City Council's headquarters
Kuala Lumpur	Merdeka Maybank		678.9 m (2,227 ft)	118	Completed	2014	2023	City Centre	World's second tallest building
Labuan	University of Malaysia Sabah Labuan International Campus		52.14 m (171.1 ft)	15	Completed	1997	1999	Sungai Pagar	-
Putrajaya	KPWKM Tower		171.8 m (564 ft)	39	Completed	2006	2011	Presint 8	Ministry of Women, Family and Community Development's headquarters

== See also ==
- List of tallest buildings in the world
- List of tallest buildings by city
- List of tallest buildings in Kuala Lumpur
- List of tallest buildings in George Town
- List of tallest buildings in Johor Bahru
- List of tallest buildings in Kota Kinabalu
- Senarai bangunan tertinggi di Kuching
