= KH Tower =

Skyscraper in Kuala Lumpur, Malaysia

Coordinates: 3.1516427°N 101.7086981°E

- Malay: Menara KH
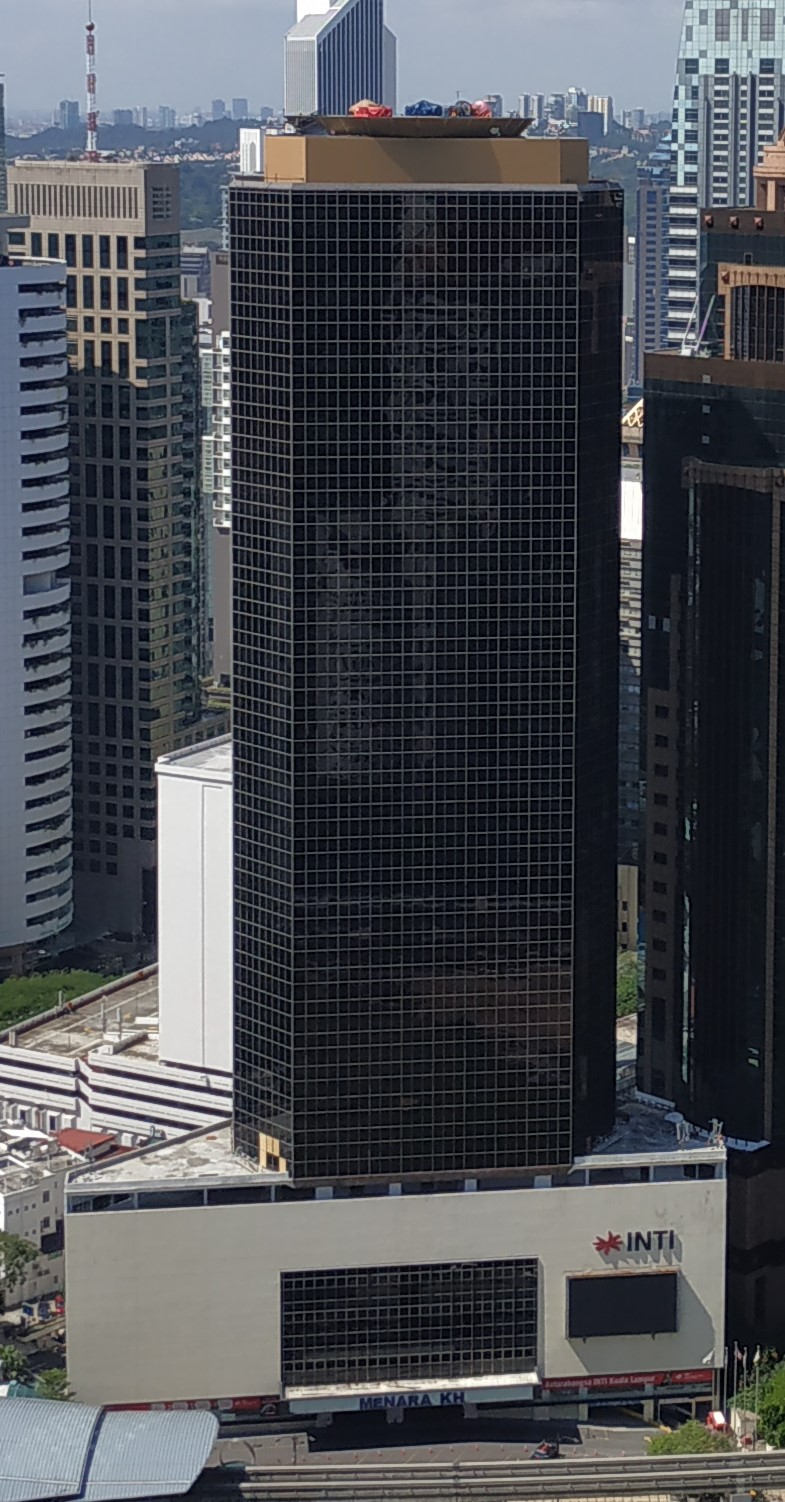
- The KH Tower in 2018
- Interactive map of the KH Tower area

General information
- Type: Offices
- Location: Jalan Sultan Ismail, Kuala Lumpur, Malaysia
- Completed: 1983

Height
- Roof: 152 m (499 ft)

Technical details
- Floor count: 36

KH Tower (Malay: Menara KH, formerly known as Promet Tower) is a 36-storey, 152 m (499 ft) tall skyscraper in Kuala Lumpur, Malaysia. Between 1983 and 1984, it was the tallest building in Malaysia, the second to surpass the height of 150 m (490 ft). It was also noted to be the first glass-clad skyscraper in the country.

== See also ==
- List of tallest buildings in Malaysia
- List of tallest buildings in Kuala Lumpur
