= The Exchange 106 =

Skyscraper in Kuala Lumpur, Malaysia

- Malay: Menara Exchange 106
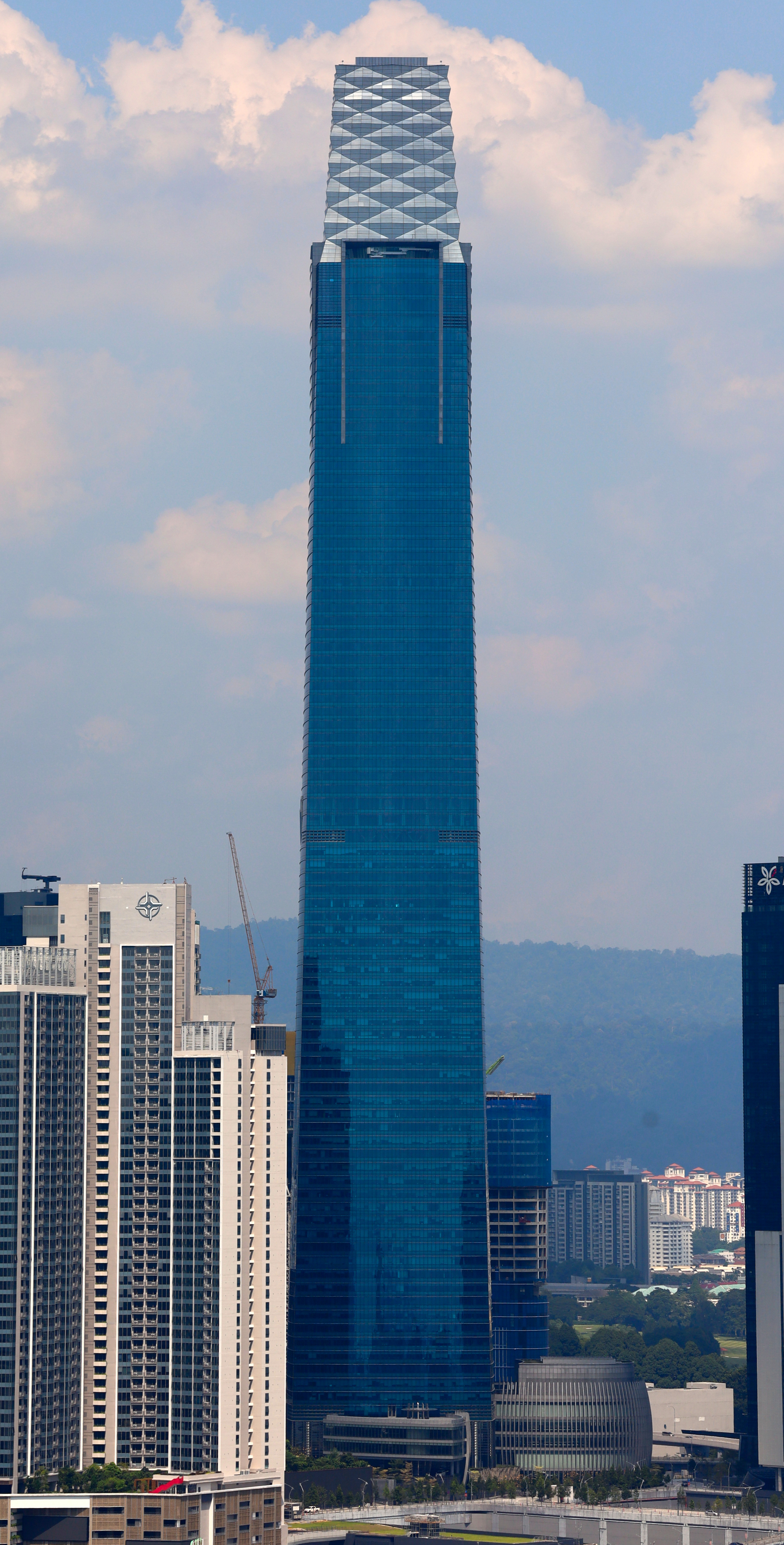
- The Exchange 106 in October 2024
- Former names: Signature Tower
- Alternative names: TRX 106, TRX Signature Tower

General information
- Status: Completed
- Type: Office
- Location: Jalan Tun Razak, Kuala Lumpur, Malaysia, Lingkaran TRX, Tun Razak Exchange, 55188 Kuala Lumpur, Malaysia
- Coordinates: 3°08′31″N 101°43′08″E
- Construction started: May 2016; 10 years ago
- Completed: August 2019; 7 years ago
- Owner: Mulia Property Development Sdn Bhd

Height
- Architectural: 454 m (1,490 ft)
- Tip: 454 m (1,490 ft)
- Top floor: 405.4 m (1,330 ft)

Technical details
- Floor count: 95
- Floor area: 453,885 m^{2} (4,886,000 sq ft)
- Lifts/elevators: 64

Design and construction
- Architects: Group Architects; Peter Chan (Architect of Record)
- Developer: Mulia Group
- Main contractor: Mulia Group

Other information
- Public transit: KG20 PY23 Tun Razak Exchange MRT station

Website
- www.exchange106.my

The Exchange 106 (Malay: Menara Exchange 106), formerly known as the TRX Signature Tower, is a 454-meter-tall (1,490-foot) supertall skyscraper in Kuala Lumpur, Malaysia. It is the second-tallest building in Malaysia and the third-tallest building in Southeast Asia. It was previously the tallest building in Malaysia upon its completion until being surpassed by Merdeka 118 in November 2023.

It is currently the 18th tallest building in the world according to the Council on Tall Buildings and Urban Habitat (CTBUH).

The Exchange 106 is the second largest skyscraper in Malaysia by floor area with 453,885 m^{2} (4,886,000 sq ft). The tower has a net lettable area of 240,000 square metres (2.6 million square feet). It is also the centerpiece of the new Tun Razak Exchange (TRX) financial district.

As of October 2019, about 46,000 m^{2} (500,000 sq ft) of Exchange 106's floor space was expected to be taken up by tenants. The floor space is column-less, and ranges from 2,600 to 3,200 m^{2} (28,000 to 34,000 sq ft).

== Proposal and development ==
The skyscraper was first conceptualized when TRX was controlled by 1Malaysia Development Berhad (1MDB), a sovereign fund owned by the Government of Malaysia. On 13 May 2015, 1MDB Real Estate Sdn Bhd (1MDB RE), the master developer of TRX, and the Mulia Group announced that, through Mulia Property Development Sdn Bhd, they had signed a Sale and Purchase agreement for the development rights of the plot of land for the Exchange 106 (then known as the Signature Tower), with the land transacted at a value of RM665 million. Groundwork on the Exchange 106 plot commenced on 1 March 2016, with the mat concrete foundation laid in May 2016 (see "Progress" section below).

Presently, Mulia Property Development Sdn Bhd is 51% owned by the Ministry of Finance through MKD Signature Sdn Bhd and 49% by Mulia International.

== Progress ==
The Exchange 106 was managed by the Mulia Group, with structural construction carried out by the China State Construction Engineering Corporation, through its Malaysian subsidiary China State Construction Engineering (M) Sdn. Bhd.

In May 2016, the tower's foundation concrete pour took place over a weekend and was the second-largest continuous concrete pour in the world. In December 2017, the building was structurally topped out, 19 months after commencement, achieving an average of 3 days a floor.

Exchange 106 achieved its Certificate of Completion and Compliance in September 2019.

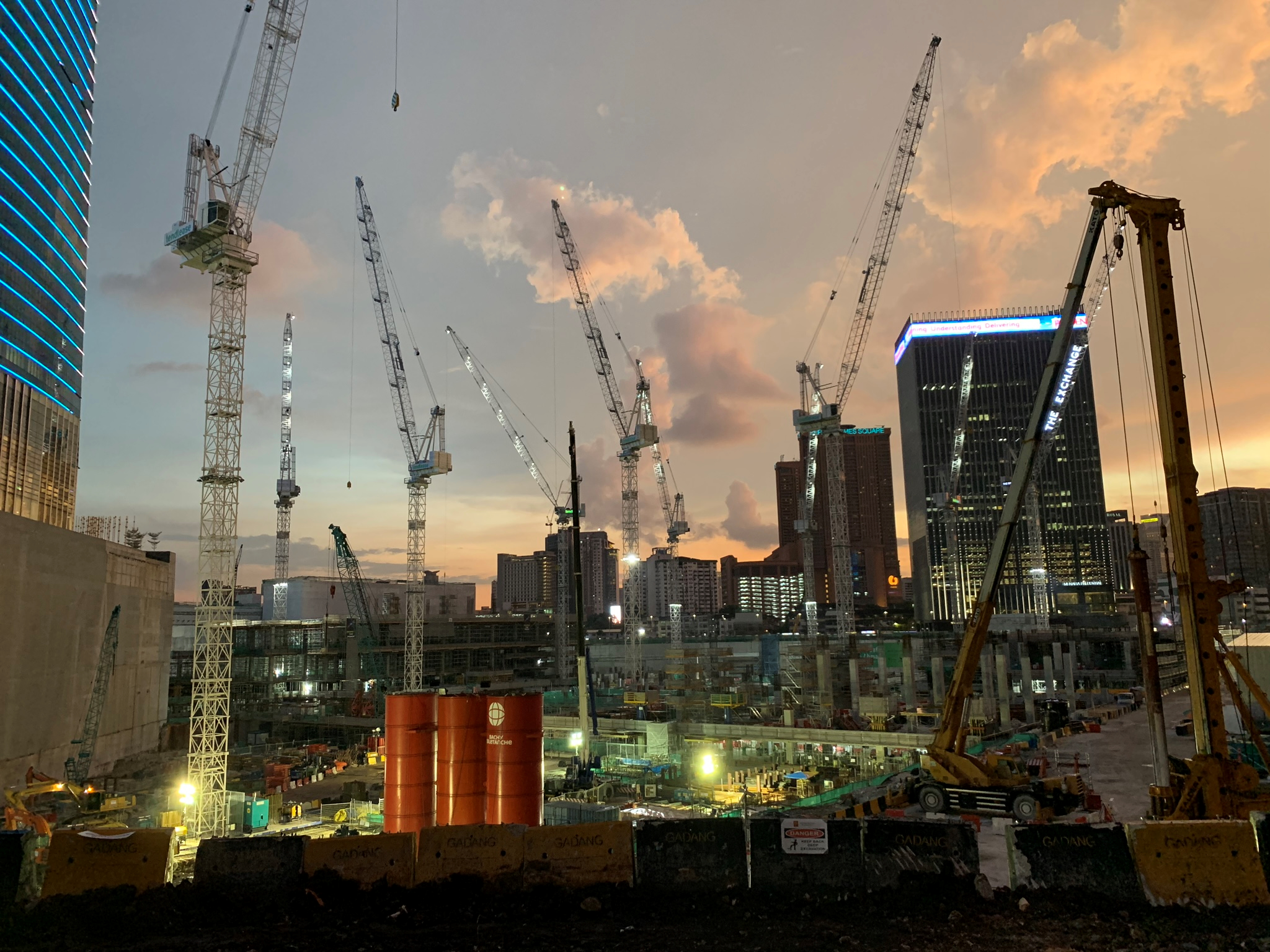
TRX shopping mall (The Exchange TRX), located at the foot of The Exchange 106, under construction in May 2019

The construction of the TRX's shopping mall (known as The Exchange TRX) which is located at the foot of the Exchange 106 was expected to be completed by the third quarter of 2021. Later on, the construction of the mall was delayed due to the strict Movement Control Order (MCO) in the country caused by the COVID-19 pandemic. The completion of the mall was pushed back to 2022 and but was subsequently opened in November 2023.

As of December 2021, the overall infrastructure of TRX was at 80 percent completion, while The Exchange TRX mall was expected to be completed in the third quarter of 2023.

== Criticism ==
The tower, along with Merdeka 118, has been referred by some Malaysians as unnecessary and a "national disgrace", with their presence on the Kuala Lumpur skyline "tainted" and signifying the legacy of the 1MDB scandal.

== Controversy over its height ==
Mulia Group began promoting around December 2017, during construction, that The Exchange 106 would reach a height of 492.3 meters, surpassing the Petronas Twin Towers to become the tallest building in Malaysia. However, it was later clarified that this measurement referred to the height above sea level, while the actual height above ground was 453.6 meters.

Subsequently, they introduced a new claim that the height was 453.6 meters, measured "from the entrance of a building sits on a significant podium," asserting that this surpassed the Petronas Twin Towers' height of 451.9 meters. This claim was temporarily accepted by the CTBUH, according to Mulia Group, but was later reassessed. Currently, CTBUH officially recognizes the architectural height as the original 453.6 meters, making it the second-tallest building in Malaysia.

== Floor Plans ==
Level	Purpose
113	Mechanichal layer 9
112	Mechanichal layer 8
111	Mechanichal layer 7
110	Mechanichal layer 6, service room
109	Mechanichal layer 5, service room
108	Sky Executive Office, VIP Lounge, In The Crown
107	Sky Executive Office, VIP Lounge, In The Crown
106	Office Zone 5
105	Office Zone 5
104	Office Zone 5
103	Office Zone 5
102	Office Zone 5
101	Office Zone 5
100	Office Zone 5
99	Office Zone 5
98	Office Zone 5
97	Office Zone 5
96	Office Zone 5
95	Office Zone 5
94	Office Zone 5
93	Office Zone 5
92	Office Zone 5
91	Office Zone 5
90	Office Zone 5
89	Office Zone 5
88	Office Zone 5
87	Office Zone 5
86	Office Zone 5
85	Office Zone 5
84	Office Zone 5
83	Office Zone 5
82	Office Zone 5
81	Office Zone 5
80	Office Zone 5
79	Office Zone 5
78	Office Zone 5
77	Office Zone 4
76	Office Zone 4
75	Office Zone 4
74	Office Zone 4
73	Office Zone 4
72	Office Zone 4
71	Office Zone 4
70	Office Zone 4
69	Office Zone 4
68	Office Zone 4
67	Office Zone 4
66	Office Zone 4
65	Office Zone 4
64	Office Zone 4
63	Office Zone 4
62	Office Zone 4
61	Office Zone 4
60	Office Zone 4
59	Office Zone 4
58	Office Zone 4
57	Sky Lobbies, Conference Room, Meeting Rooms, Restaurant, Executive Lounge
56	Sky Lobbies, Conference Room, Meeting Rooms, Restaurant, Executive Lounge
55	Mechanichal layer 4
54	Mechanichal layer 3
53	Office Zone 3
52	Office Zone 3
51	Office Zone 3
50	Office Zone 3
49	Office Zone 3
48	Office Zone 3
47	Office Zone 3
46	Office Zone 3
45	Office Zone 3
44	Office Zone 3
43	Office Zone 3
42	Office Zone 3
41	Office Zone 3
40	Office Zone 3
39	Office Zone 3
38	Office Zone 3
37	Office Zone 2
36	Office Zone 2
35	Office Zone 2
34	Office Zone 2
33	Office Zone 2
32	Office Zone 2
31	Office Zone 2
30	Office Zone 2
29	Office Zone 2
28	Office Zone 2
27	Office Zone 2
26	Office Zone 2
25	Office Zone 2
24	Office Zone 2
23	Office Zone 2
22	Office Zone 2
21	Office Zone 1
20	Office Zone 1
19	Office Zone 1
18	Office Zone 1
17	Office Zone 1
16	Office Zone 1
15	Office Zone 1
14	Office Zone 1
13	Office Zone 1
12	Office Zone 1
11	Office Zone 1
10	Office Zone 1
9	Office Zone 1
8	Office Zone 1
7	Office Zone 1
6	Office Zone 1
5	Mechanichal layer 2
4	TRX Shopping Mall, Sky Terrace Food Hall, IMAX Cinema, Board room, Restaurants, Cafe, Meeting rooms, Exchange 106 Podium
3	TRX Shopping Mall, Apple Store, F&B Outlets, IMAX Cinema, Sky Terrace Garden, Main Office Entrance, Exchange 106 Podium
2	TRX Shopping Mall, SEIBU Department Store, Apple Store, Fashion Outlets, F&B Outlets, Executive Lounge, Exchange 106 Podium
1	TRX Shopping Mall, SEIBU Department Store, Fashion Outlets, F&B Outlets, TRX Linkway, Executive Lounge, Exchange 106 Podium
G	TRX Shopping Mall, SEIBU Department Store, Fashion Outlets, F&B Outlets, Mall Main Entrance, Concierge, Valet Parking, TRX Street MRT Entrance
C	TRX Shopping Mall, SEIBU Department Store, Exchange 106 Food Hall, F&B Outlets, TRX Underground MRT Entrance
P1	TRX Parking Garage, Logistic & Control Room
P2	TRX Parking Garage, Loading Bay
P3	TRX Parking Garage, Loading Bay
P4	TRX Parking Garage
P5	TRX Parking Garage
P6	TRX Parking Garage
P7	TRX Parking Garage
P8	TRX Parking Garage, Mechanichal layer 1

(All of the floor plans and its level arrangements were obtained from the building's proposals and may be subject to change.)

== Gallery ==
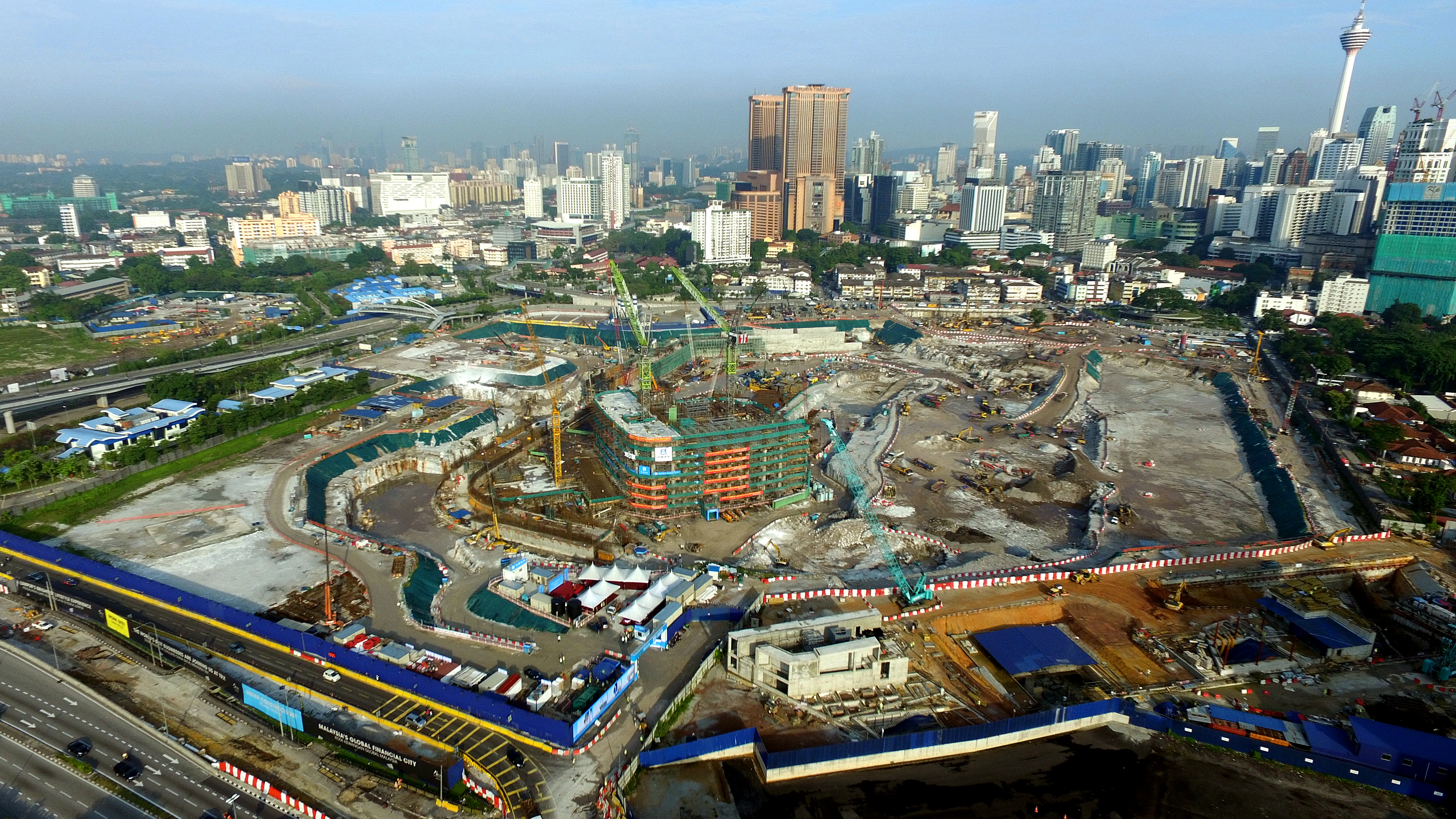
Construction of the tower in July 2016

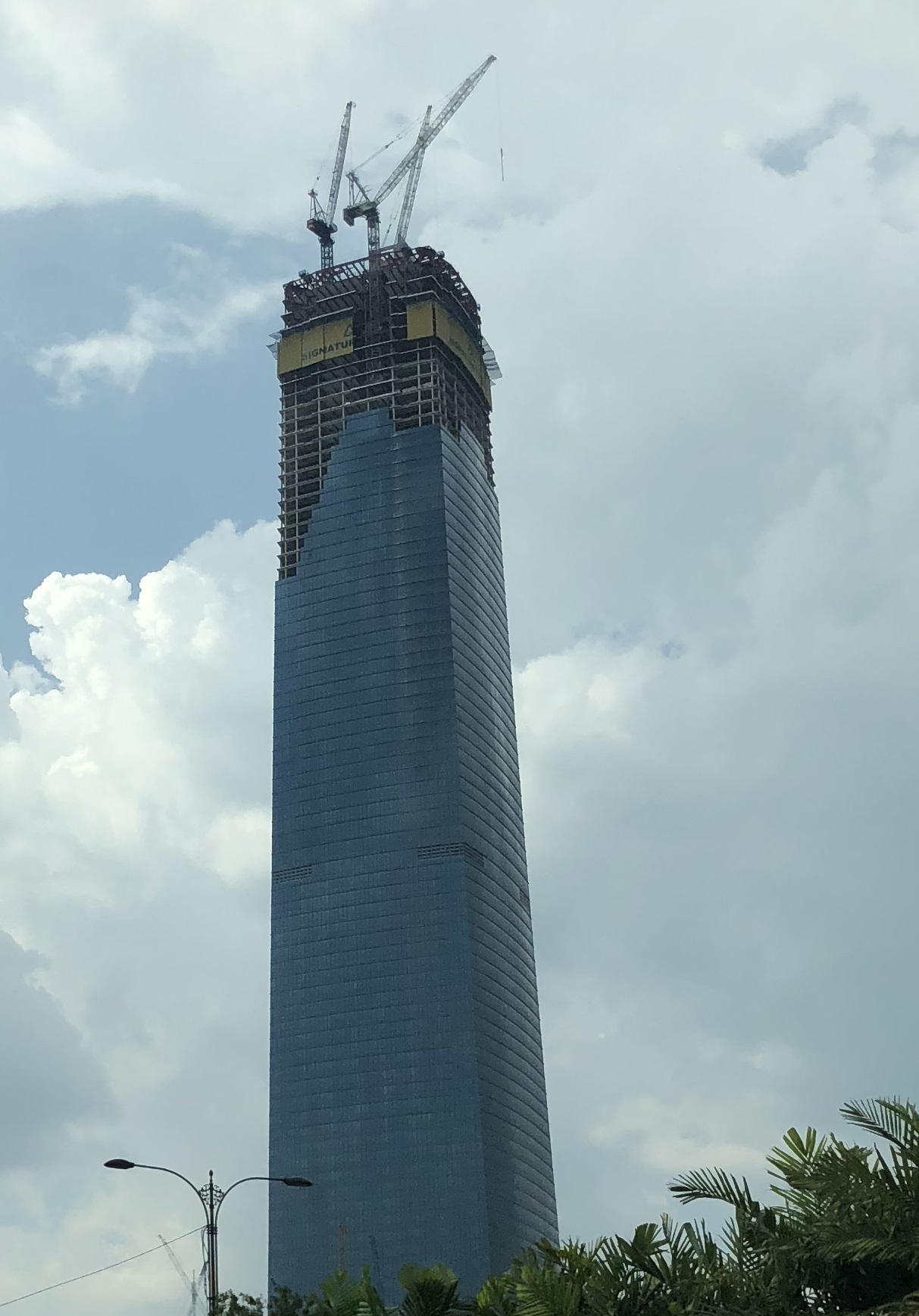
Exchange 106 under construction in TRX Kuala Lumpur in January 2018

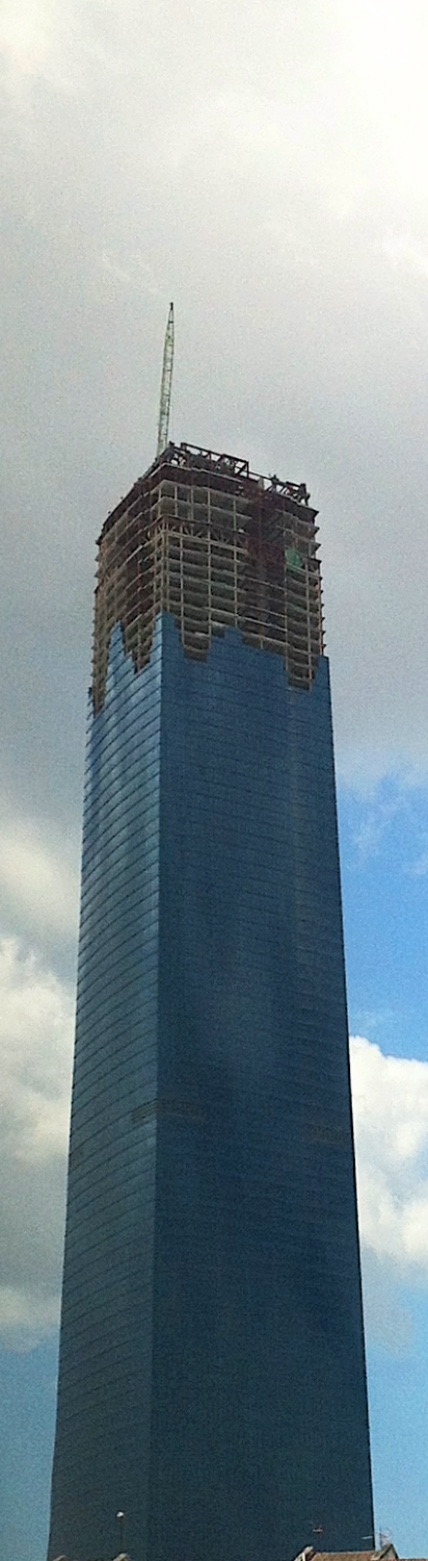
Construction progress as of 11 March 2018

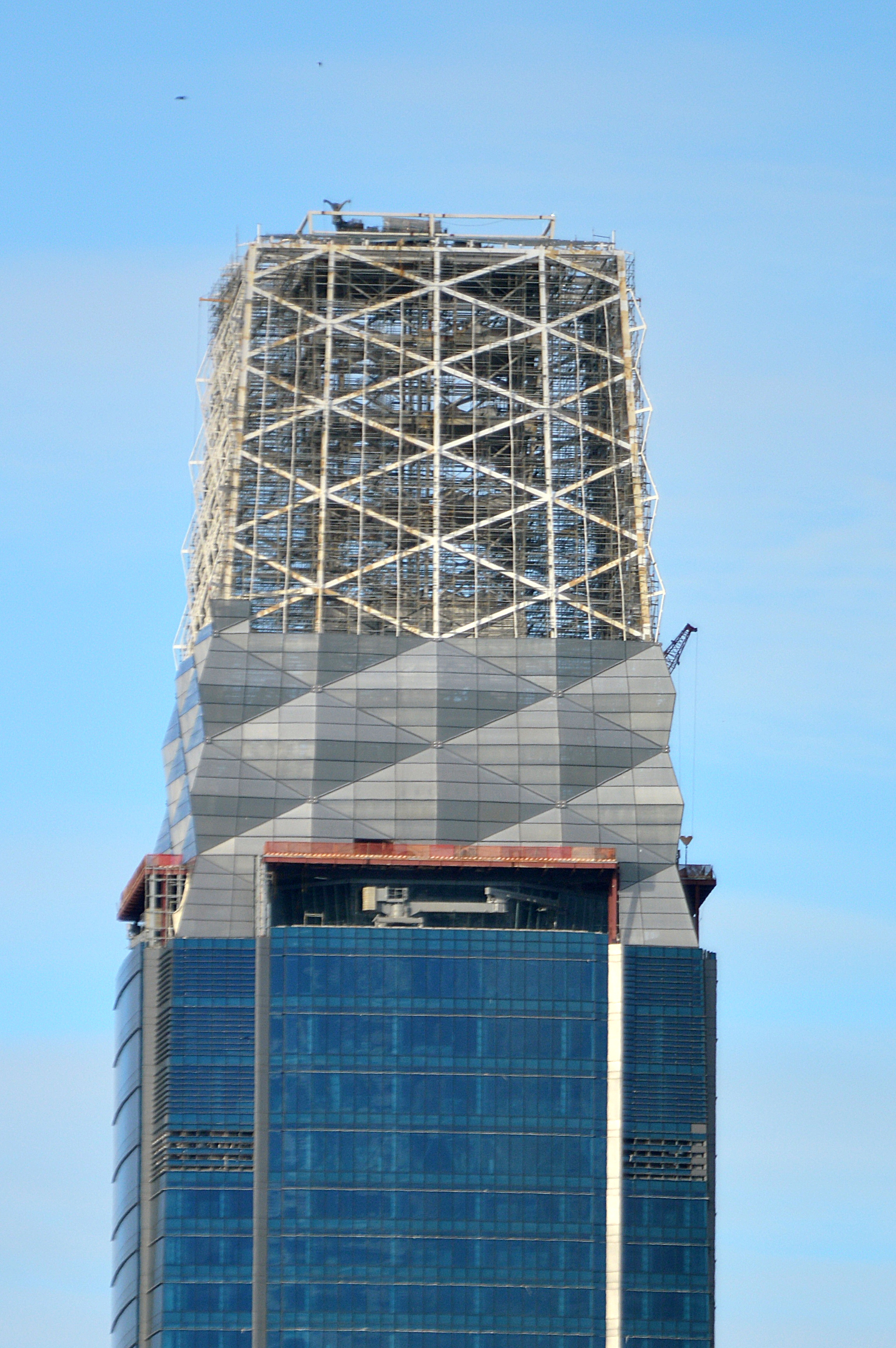
Top of the tower on 7 November 2018

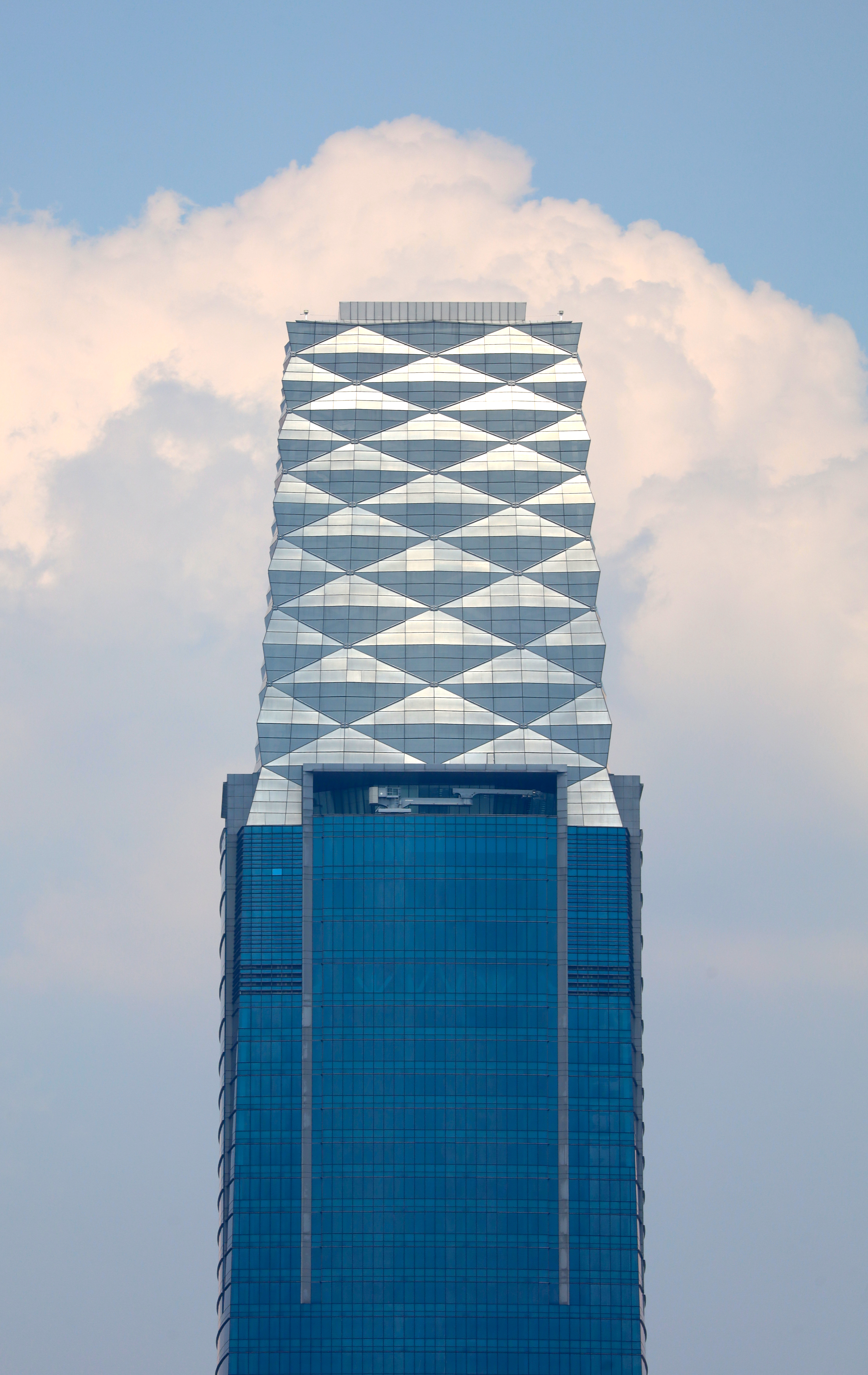
Top of the tower on 22 October 2024

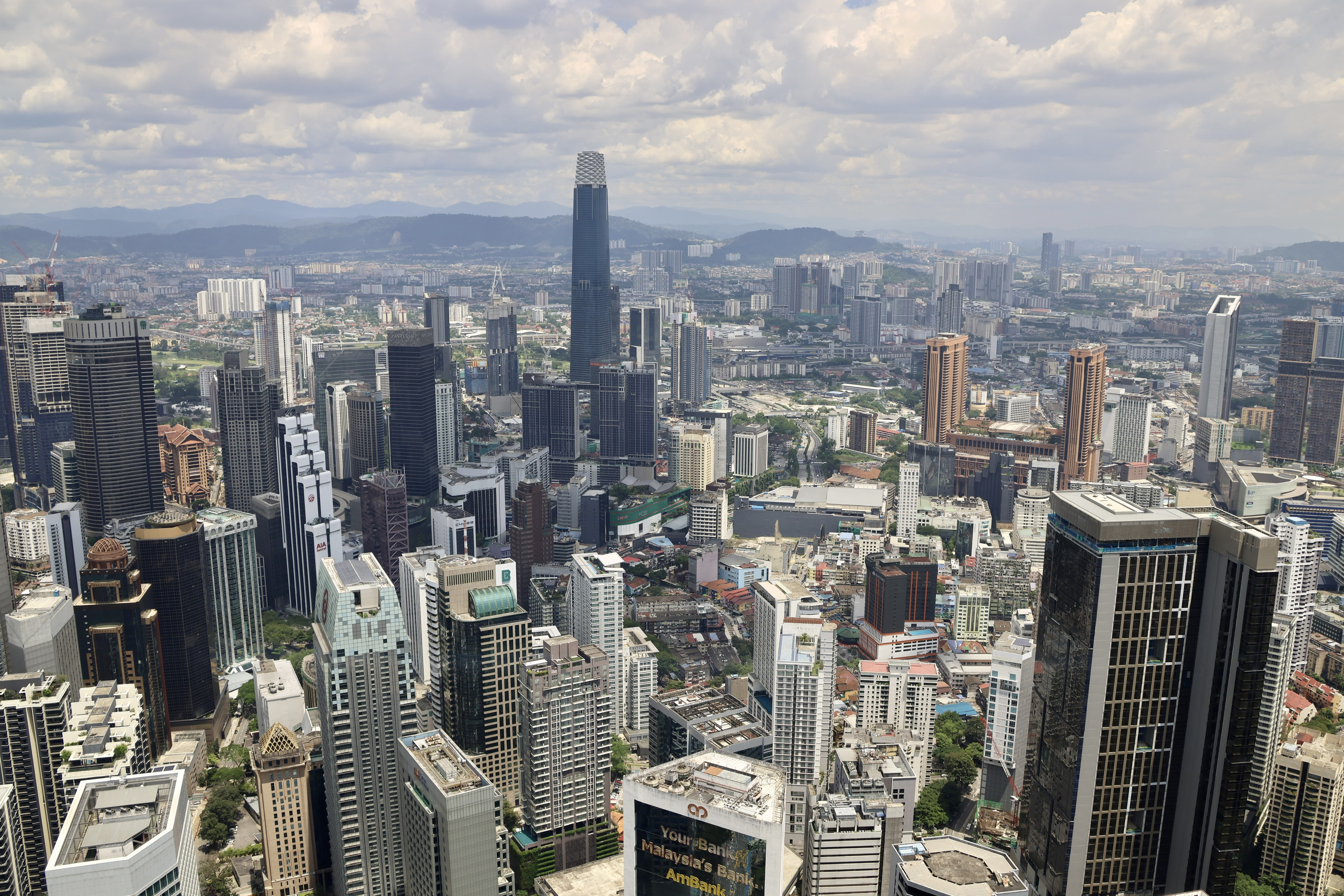
View from Kuala Lumpur Tower in 2023

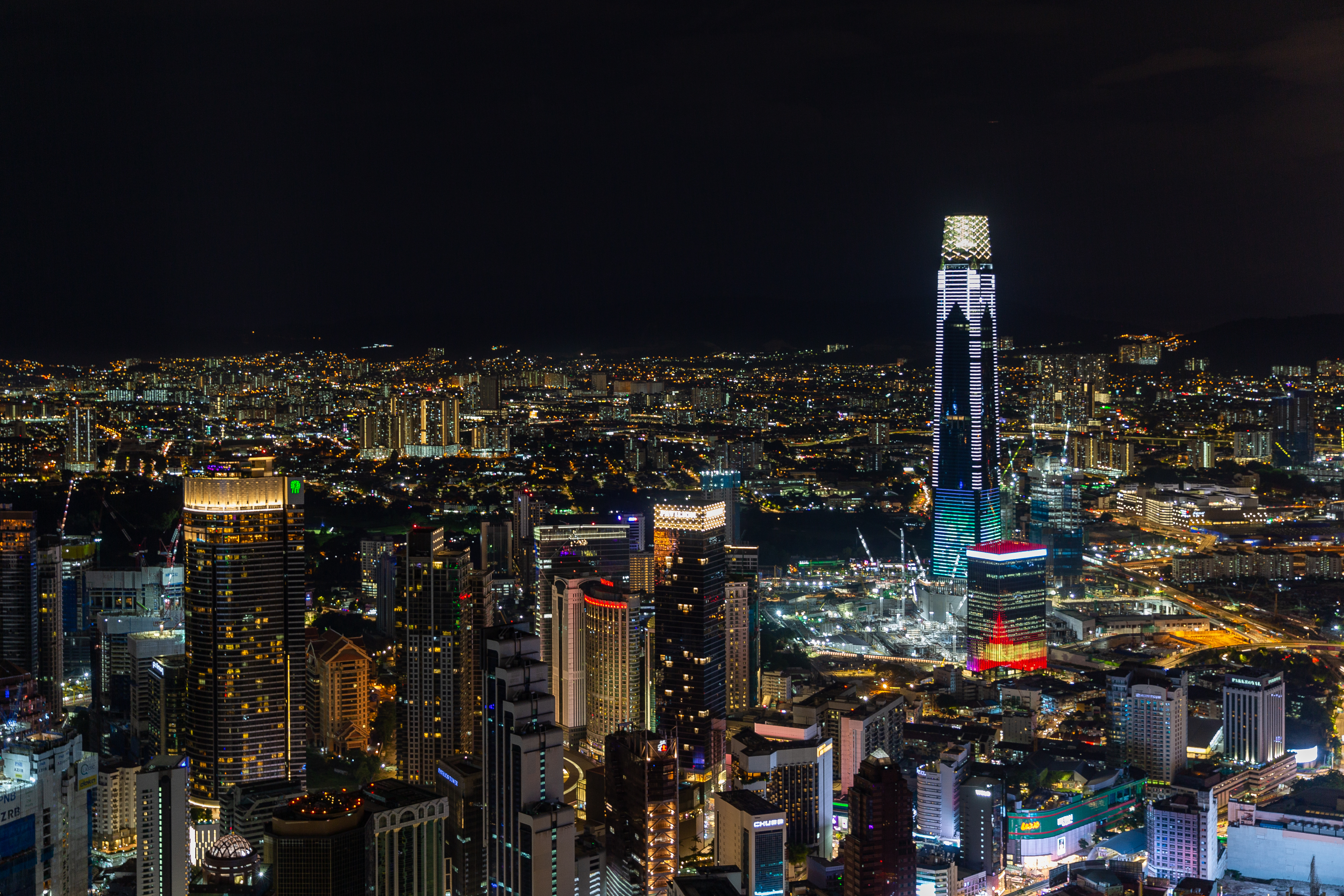
64.1-meter illuminated crown at night

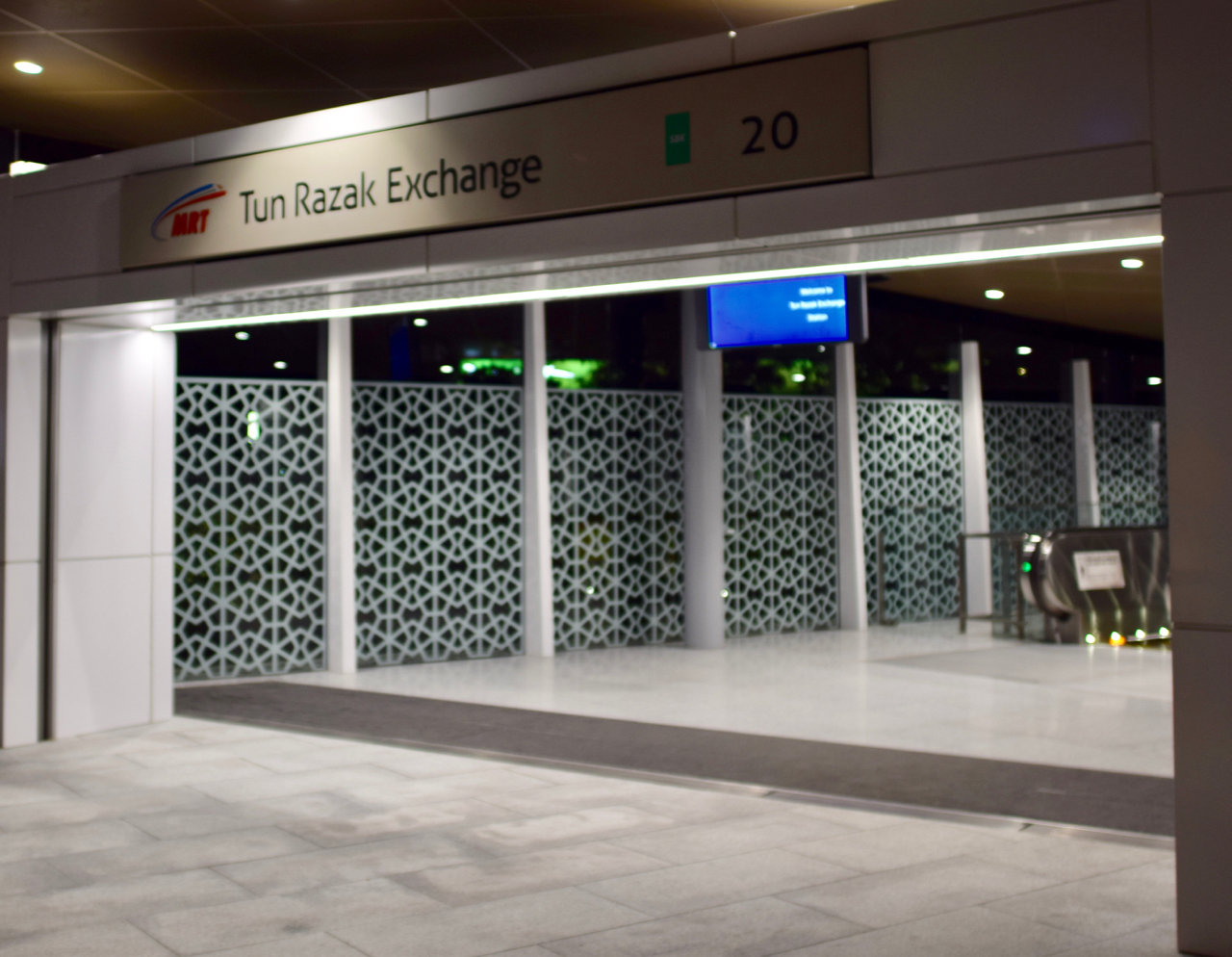
Tun Razak Exchange MRT Station entrance

== Transportation ==
The skyscraper is currently served by the Kajang Line KG20 and the Putrajaya Line PY23 with one station, the Tun Razak Exchange MRT underground station on site. The underground station is one of two interchanges between the Kajang and Putrajaya MRT lines.

== See also ==
- Tun Razak Exchange
- List of tallest buildings in Malaysia
- List of tallest buildings in Kuala Lumpur
- List of tallest buildings in the world
- List of buildings with 100 floors or more
