= Tradewinds Square Tower =

Site of proposed skyscraper in Kuala Lumpur, Malaysia

Coordinates: 3°09′07″N 101°42′40″E

- Rendering of the tower in Kuala Lumpur
- Former names: New Tradewinds Square, Menara Tradewinds 1, Tradewinds Centre Tower

General information
- Status: On-hold
- Type: Office
- Location: Kuala Lumpur City Centre, Kuala Lumpur, Malaysia
- Owner: Tradewinds Corporation

Height
- Architectural: 775 m (2,543 ft)

Technical details
- Floor count: 150

Design and construction
- Architects: DP Architects; Woods Bagot
- Developer: Tradewinds Corporation Berhad
- Structural engineer: Leslie E. Robertson Associates
- Other designers: Heintges & Associates

Other information
- Public transit: MR7 Raja Chulan station

The Tradewinds Square Tower was a proposed megatall skyscraper located along Jalan Sultan Ismail in Kuala Lumpur, Malaysia. The building was in planning stage with Tradewinds Corporation Berhad as the developer. It would have stood at a height of 775 m (2,543 ft) with 150 floors. It was expected to be completed in 2022, but construction was halted in 2018.

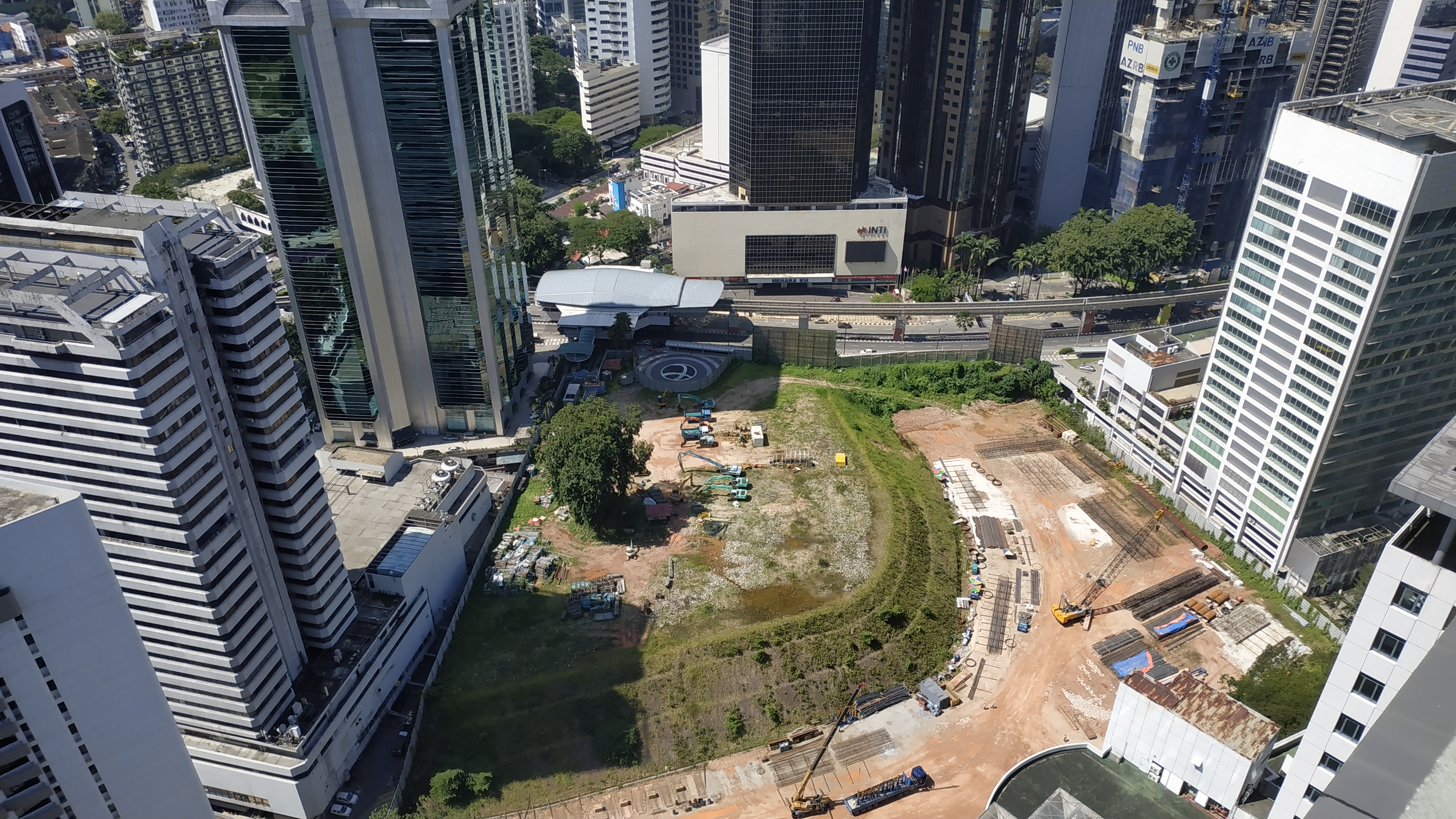
The land of the proposed construction in November 2018.

The whole integrated development was previously known as Tradewinds Centre, before being renamed to Tradewinds Square. The development was expected to be built on the former Crowne Plaza Mutiara Hotel and Kompleks Antarabangsa site which were demolished in 2013. The company estimated that the RM6 billion ($1.37 billion USD) project would have taken seven years to complete, with construction expected to commence in early 2013. The development built up area was about 420,000 m^{2} (4,500,000 sq ft) which sits on a 2.8 ha (7 acres) freehold site between Jalan Sultan Ismail and Jalan Perak. It would have comprised Grade A corporate offices, serviced apartments, a 6-star hotel, and a retail podium.

In 2016, the plot ratio for the development was increased to 16.

Since 2020, the site serves as a parking lot.

== Public transport ==
The tower and its development would have been accessible via the Raja Chulan station on the KL Monorail line.

== See also ==
- Tower M
- Merdeka 118
- List of tallest buildings in Malaysia
