= Oxley Towers =

- Oxley Towers in September 2026
- Interactive map of the Oxley Towers area

General information
- Status: Completed
- Location: Kuala Lumpur, Malaysia
- Coordinates: 3°09′33″N 101°42′54″E

Height
- Height: Tower 1: 345 metres (1,132 ft); Tower 2: 219.6 metres (720 ft); Tower 3: 145.8 metres (478 ft)

Technical details
- Floor count: Tower 1: 84; Tower 2: 52; Tower 3: 31

The Oxley Towers are three interlinked mixed-use skyscrapers topped-out in Kuala Lumpur City Centre, Kuala Lumpur, Malaysia. The complex, which is a joint venture led by Langham Hospitality Group and Oxley Holdings, is scheduled to open in 2027. Towers 1, 2, and 3 are 345 metres (1,132 ft), 219.6 metres (720 ft), and 145.8 metres (478 ft) tall and have 84, 52, and 31 stories respectively.

== See also ==
- List of tallest buildings in Malaysia
- List of tallest buildings in Kuala Lumpur
