= Ilham Tower =

Skyscraper in Kuala Lumpur, Malaysia

Coordinates: 3°09′32″N 101°43′08″E

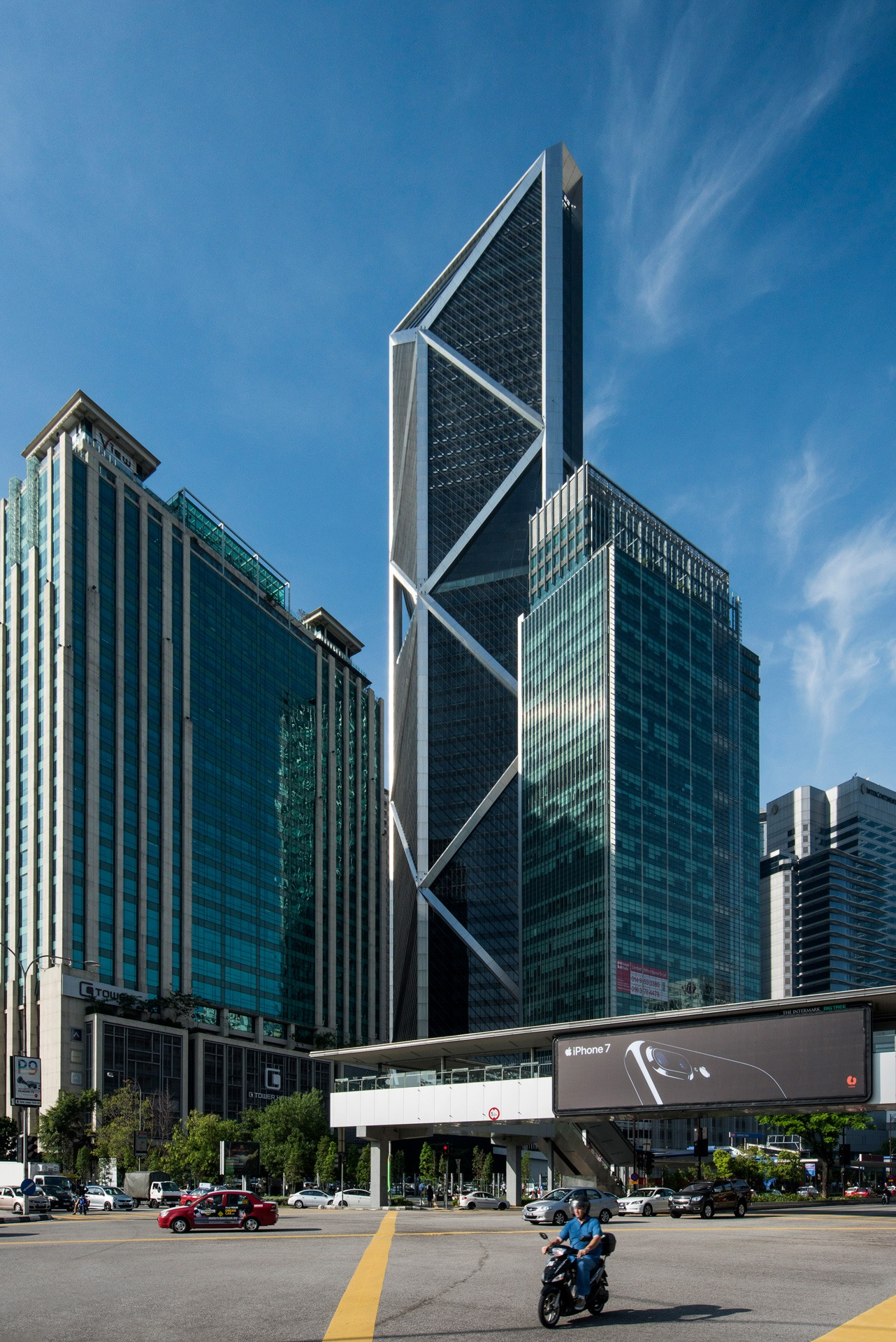
- Ilham Tower
- Interactive map of the Ilham Tower area

General information
- Type: Office, serviced apartment and others
- Architectural style: Neo-futurism
- Location: Jalan Binjai, Kuala Lumpur, Malaysia
- Construction started: 2010
- Completed: 2015

Height
- Roof: 274 m (899 ft)
- Top floor: 271 m (889 ft)

Technical details
- Floor count: 58
- Floor area: 93,000 m^{2} (1,000,000 sq ft)

Design and construction
- Architect: Foster and Partners
- Developer: IB Tower Sdn. Bhd.
- Main contractor: Daewoo E&C

Ilham Tower, also known as Ilham Baru Tower and IB Tower, is a 58-storey, 274-metre-tall skyscraper in Kuala Lumpur, Malaysia. It is Malaysia's seventh tallest building. The design of Ilham Tower is the outcome of an extensive and meticulous form-finding process. Its diagonal exoskeleton, which includes triangulated concrete frames and external trusses, contrasts with the elegant glazing that forms part of the building's structural facade.

The architecture of Ilham Tower, characterized by its dramatic lines and form, is poised to become a city landmark. The tower comprises 33 floors of office suites and 22 floors of serviced apartments, totaling a gross floor area of 93,000 m^{2} (1,000,000 sq ft). Additionally, Ilham Tower provides parking facilities for both employees and visitors.

== MACC seizure of Ilham Tower ==
On 18 December 2023, the Malaysian Anti-Corruption Commission (MACC) seized Ilham Tower as part of its investigation into the Pandora Papers, which surfaced in 2021. The inquiry extended to the financial dealings of several entities, including Ilham Tower Sdn Bhd, a majority-owned subsidiary of Ilham Baru Sdn Bhd.

Ilham Baru Sdn Bhd is controlled by Na’imah Abdul Khalid and her two sons, Mohammed Amin Zainuddin Daim and Muhammed Amir Zainuddin Daim. They are the wife and sons of former Malaysian finance minister Daim Zainuddin.

== Access ==
Ilham Tower is within walking distance from Persiaran KLCC and Ampang Park metro stations.

== See also ==
- List of tallest buildings in Malaysia
- List of tallest buildings in Kuala Lumpur
