= Vortex Tower (Kuala Lumpur) =

Skyscraper in Kuala Lumpur, Malaysia

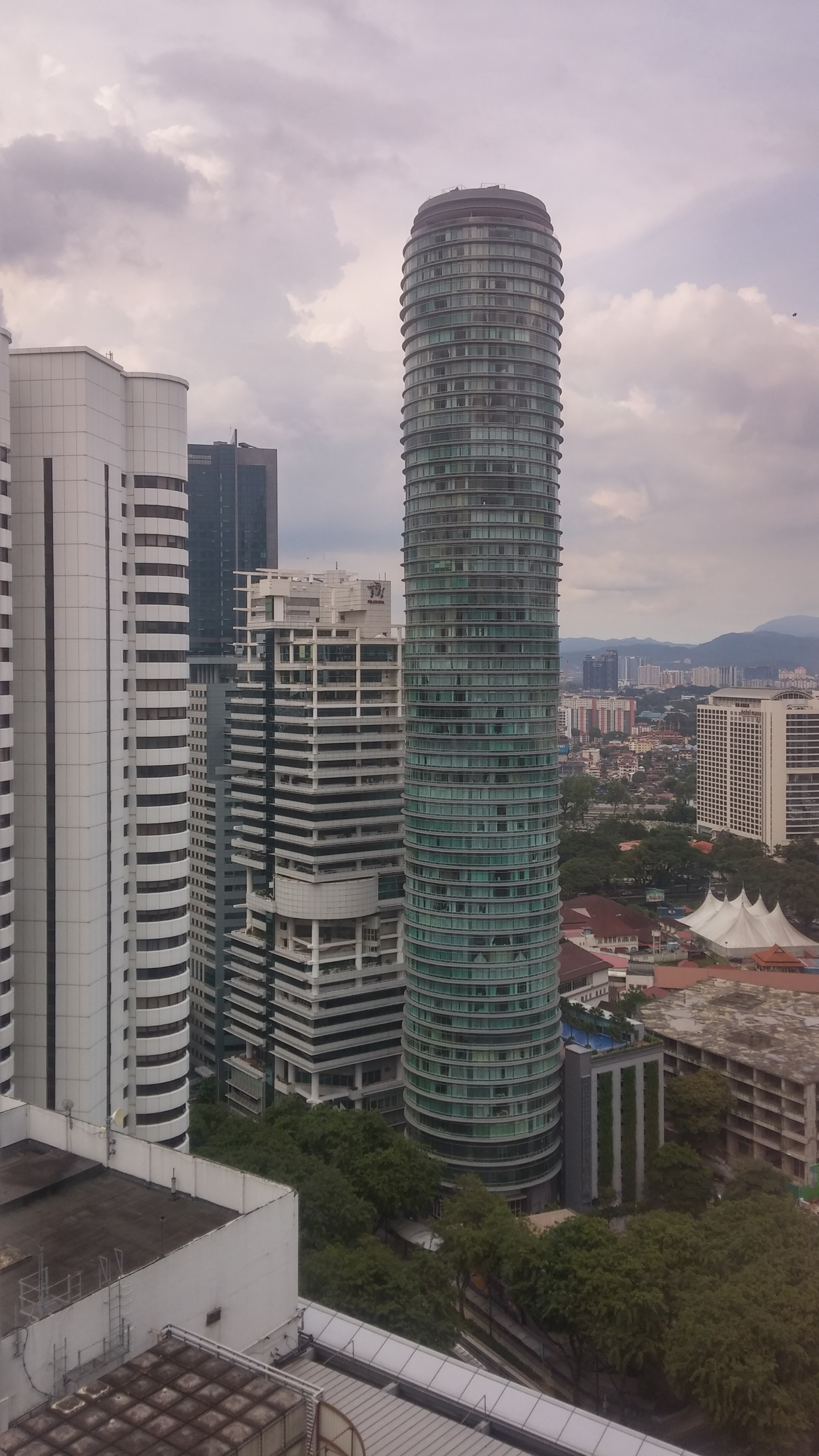
- View of the skyscraper
- Interactive map of the Vortex Tower area
- Former names: VortexKLCC; Vortex Hotel Suites & Residences

General information
- Type: Residential
- Location: 12, Jalan Sultan Ismail, Kuala Lumpur, Malaysia
- Coordinates: 3.1547°N 101.7073°E
- Construction started: 2014
- Completed: 2016

Height
- Height: 235 m (771 ft) (estimations); 260 m (850 ft) (unofficial)

Technical details
- Floor count: 58

Design and construction
- Developer: Monoland Corporation

Vortex Towers, or Vortex Hotel Suites & Residences is a 58-storey, 235 m (771 ft) tall residential skyscraper located at Kuala Lumpur, Malaysia. Construction of the skyscraper began in 2014 and was completed in 2016. The construction project was developed by Monoland Corporation, a Malaysian-based property developer that was previously involved in other skyscraper projects in Penang, notably 8 Gurney. The development consists of 248 apartment units.

== See also ==
- List of tallest buildings in Malaysia
- List of tallest buildings in Kuala Lumpur
