= Gohtong Jaya =

Coordinates: 3°23′51″N 101°46′06″E

Gohtong Jaya ڬوهتوڠ جاي
- Service Township
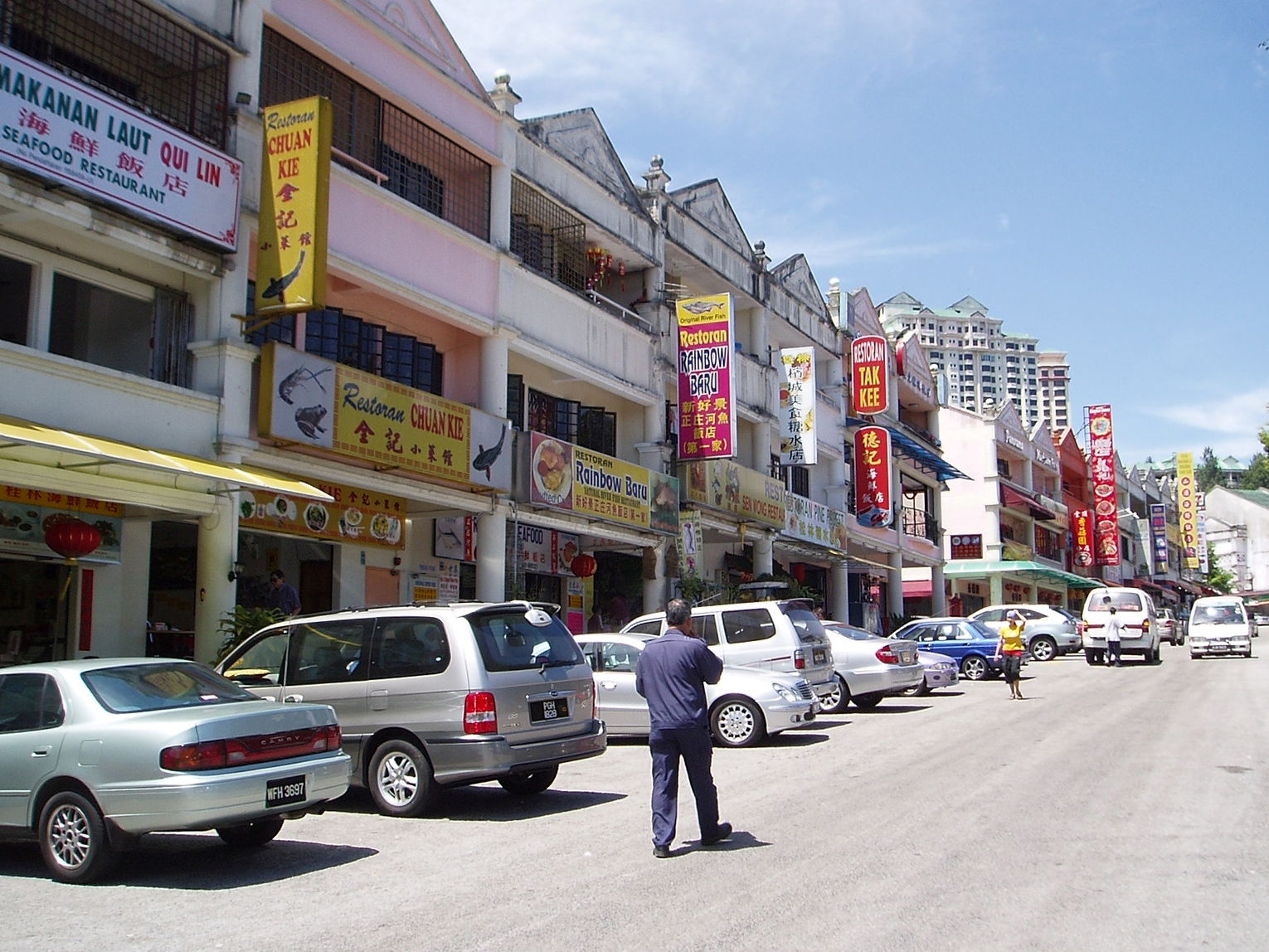
- Gohtong Jaya township.

- Location in Malaysia
- Country: Malaysia
- State: Pahang
- Time zone: UTC+8 (MST)
  - Summer (DST): Not observed

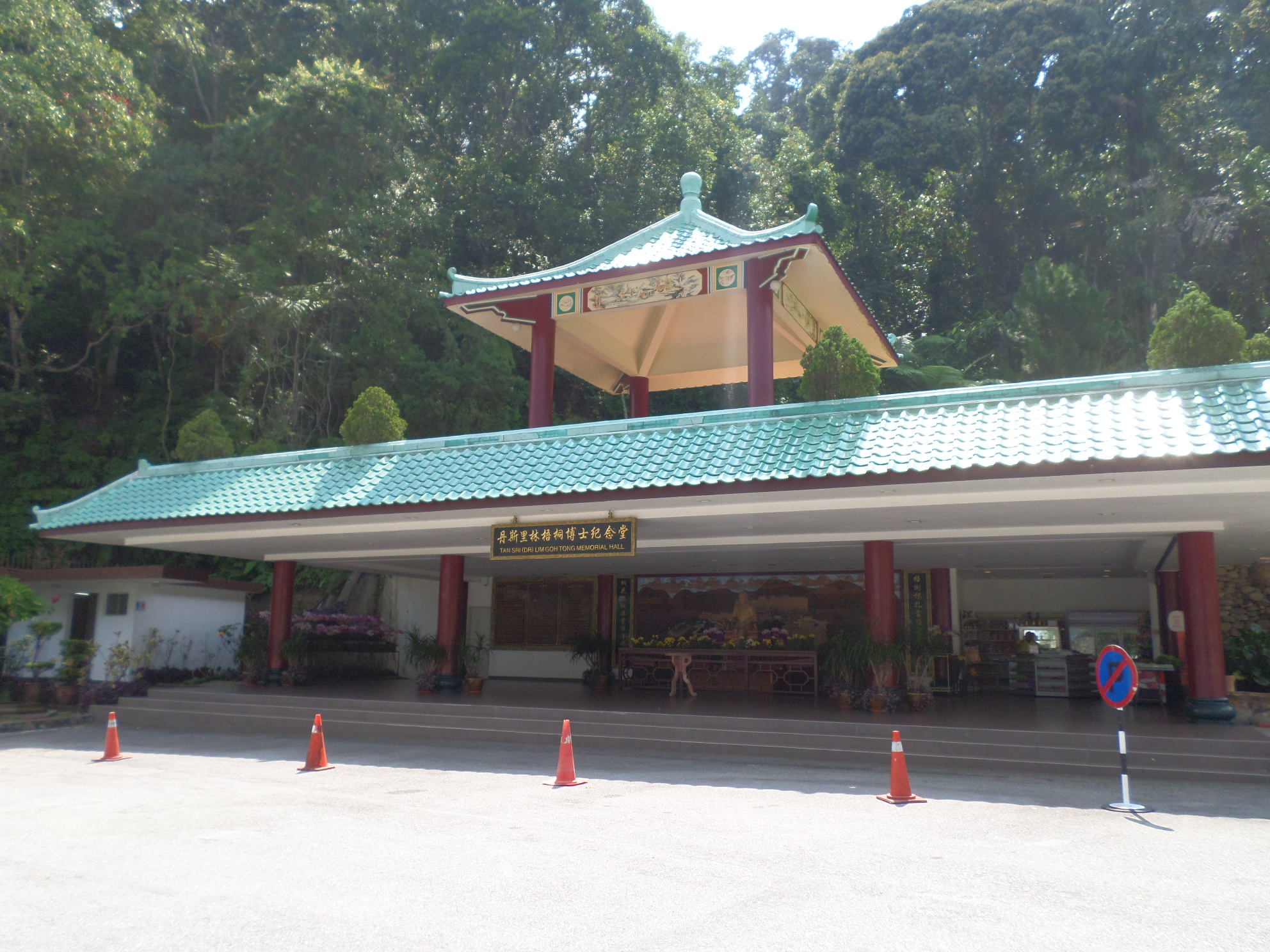
Tan Sri (Dr) Lim Goh Tong Memorial Hall

Gohtong Jaya (Jawi: ڬوهتوڠ جاي, Chinese: 梧桐再也) is a service township of Genting Highlands named after Lim Goh Tong, the founder of Genting Group and Genting Highlands himself. It has several facilities such as hotels (including one Hotel Seri Malaysia branch), restaurants, shops, apartments, housing areas, a sports centre, one Aminuddin Baki Institute branch, three schools - Sri Layang National Primary School, Sri Layang National Secondary School and Highlands International Boarding School (Saleha Private High School) and two lower stations for the two cable car systems which both ascend to the top of Genting Highlands - the Awana Skyway at the Pahang side and Genting Skyway at the Selangor side.

Gohtong Memorial Park is located in this township, burial site for the late Tan Sri Lim Goh Tong.

== See also ==
- Genting Highlands
