= Grand Seasons Hotel =

Hotel and skyscraper in Kuala Lumpur, Malaysia

- Hotel Grand Seasons
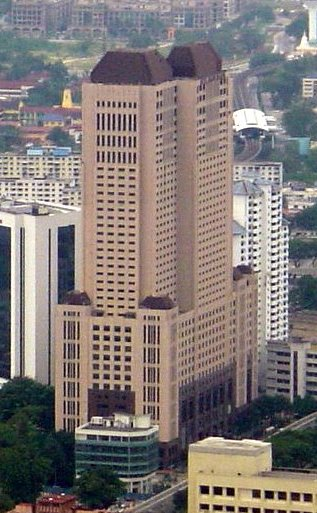

General information
- Status: Repurposed into Irama Kuala Lumpur
- Type: hotel
- Location: Kuala Lumpur, Malaysia
- Opened: 1997
- Closed: 2019

The Grand Seasons Hotel (Malay: Hotel Grand Seasons) is a three star hotel built between the years 1996 and 1998 in Kuala Lumpur, Malaysia. It is the tallest hotel in Malaysia as certified by the Malaysian Book of Records, standing 184 meters (603 ft) above ground. The hotel is 40 floors tall and has 800 rooms. On 28 February 2019, the hotel ceased operations after more than 20 years in business.

In present, the hotel was re-opened as Irama Kuala Lumpur, opened in 2026.
