= Skyline =

Outline or shape viewed near the horizon

Skyline of Lower Manhattan in 2021. The term "Skyline" was first used for New York City in 1896.

A skyline is the outline or shape viewed near the horizon. It can be created by a city's overall structure, or by human intervention in a rural setting, or in nature that is formed where the sky meets buildings or the land.

City skylines serve as a pseudo-fingerprint as no two skylines are alike. For this reason, news and sports programs, television shows, and movies often display the skyline of a city to set a location. The term The Sky Line of New York City was introduced in 1896, when it was the title of a color lithograph by Charles Graham for the color supplement of the New York Journal. Paul D. Spreiregen, FAIA, has called a [city] skyline "a physical representation [of a city's] facts of life ... a potential work of art ... its collective vista."

== Features ==
=== High-rise buildings ===
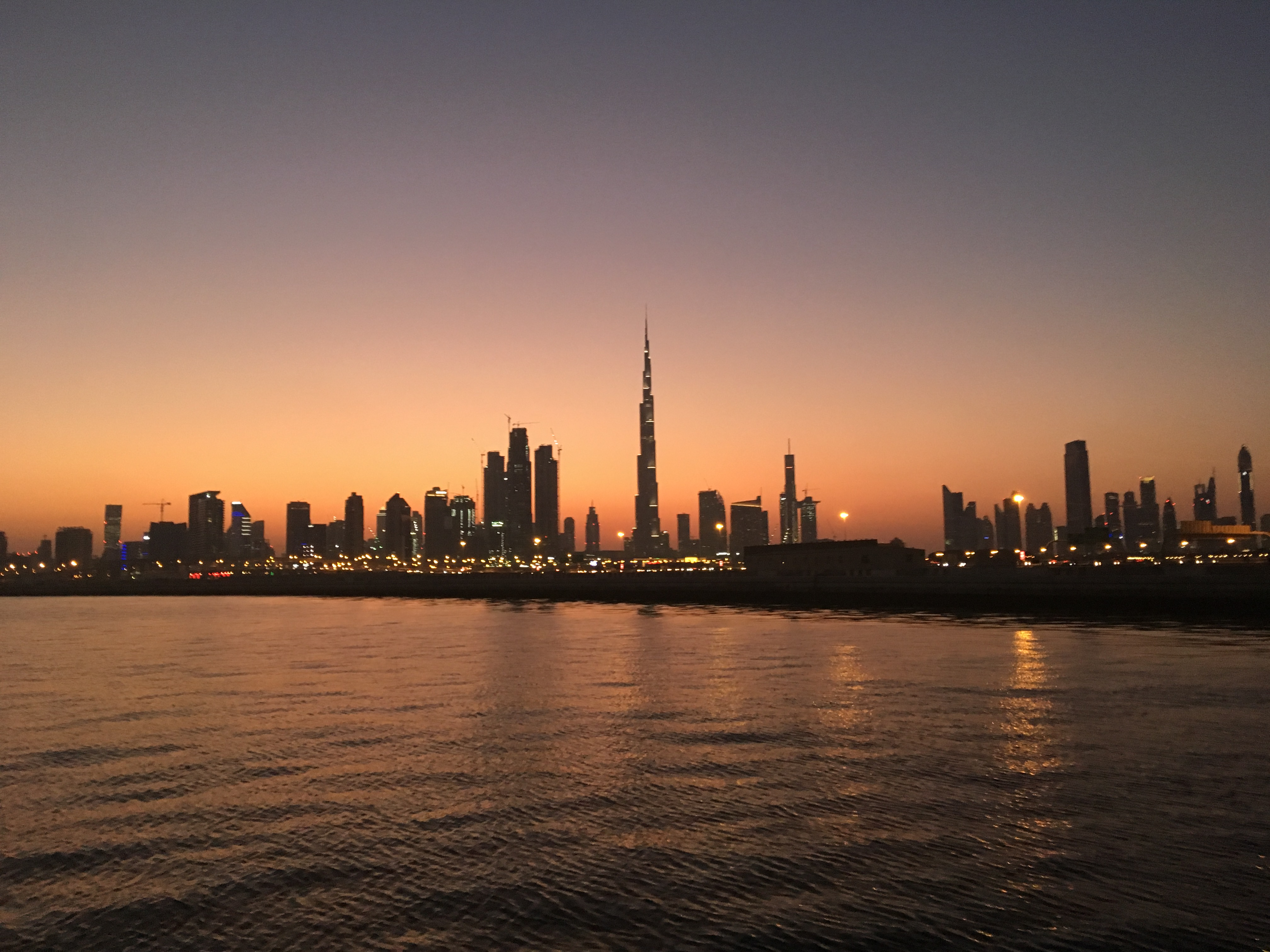
Photographic silhouette of the Dubai skyline; Burj Khalifa, the world's tallest building, is visible at the center.

High-rise buildings, including skyscrapers, are the fundamental features of urban skylines. Both contours and cladding (brick or glass) make an impact on the overall appearance of a skyline.

=== Towers ===
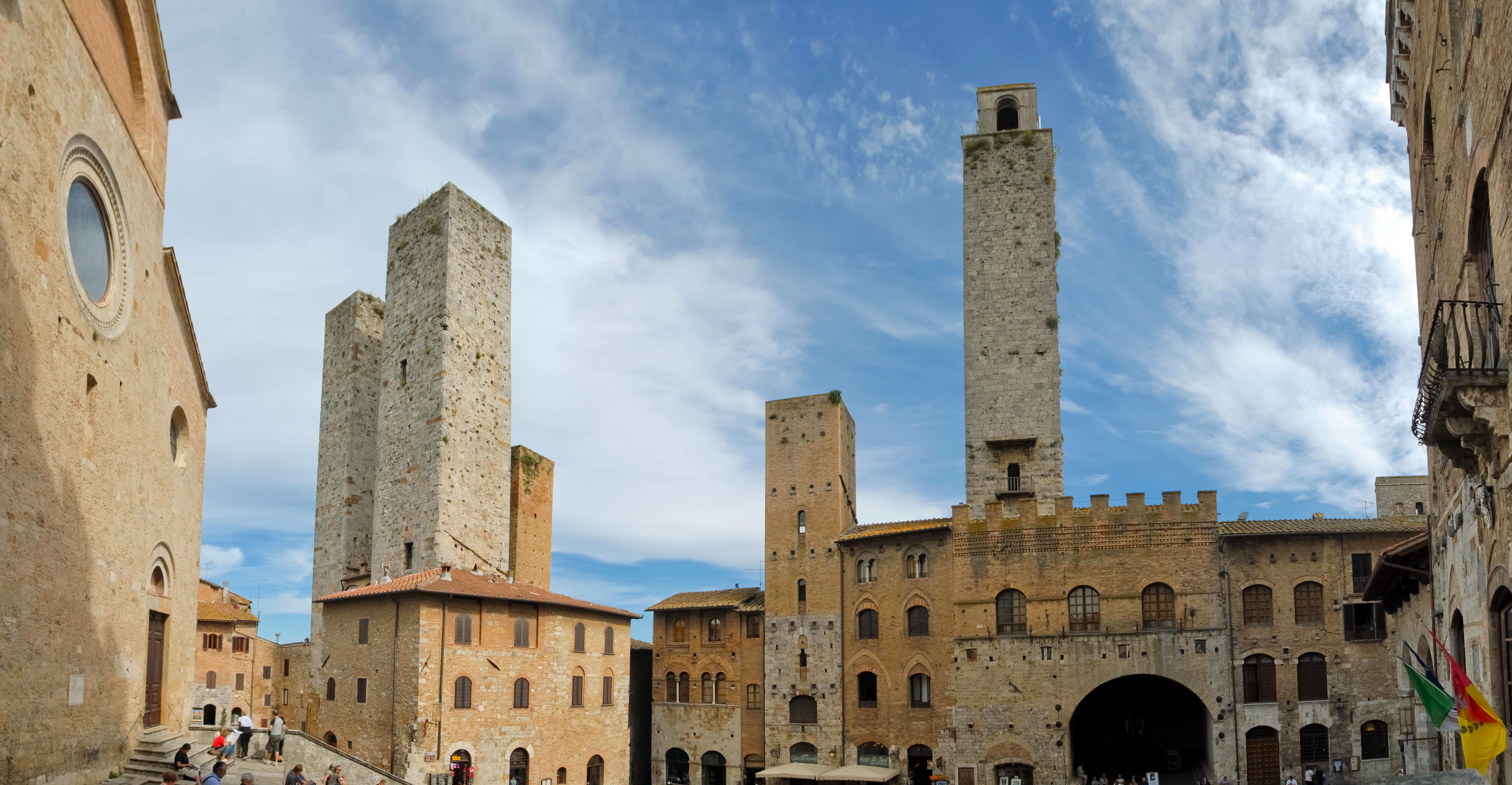
San Gimignano Towers in Tuscany, Italy

Towers from different eras make for contrasting skylines.

San Gimignano, in Tuscany, Italy, has been described as having an "unforgettable skyline" with its competitively built towers.

=== Remote locations ===
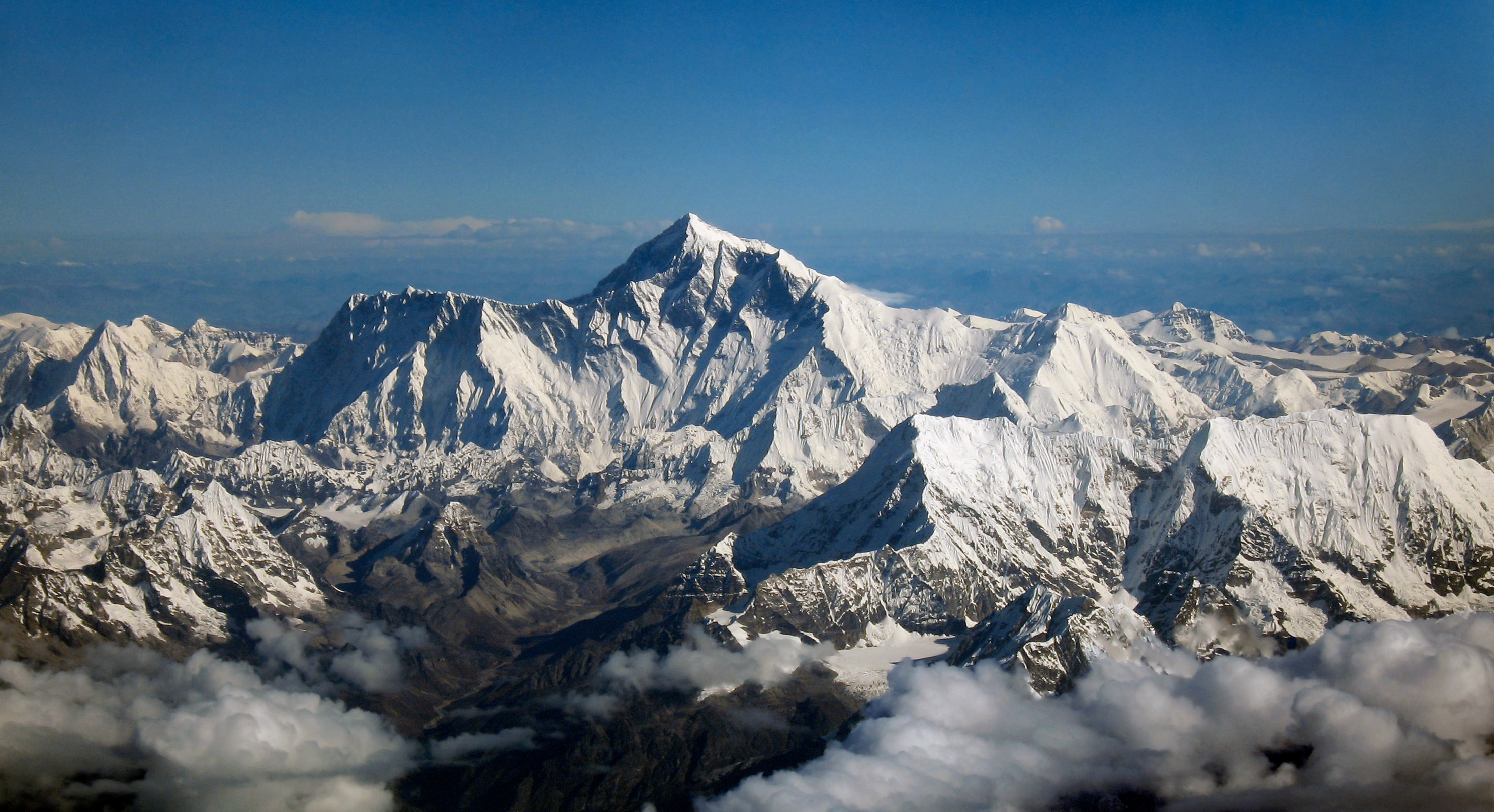
Mount Everest

Some remote locations have notably striking skylines, created either by nature or by sparse human settlement in an environment not conducive to housing significant populations.

== Use in media ==
Skylines are often used as backgrounds and establishing shots in film, television programs, news websites, and in other forms of media.

== Subjective ranking ==
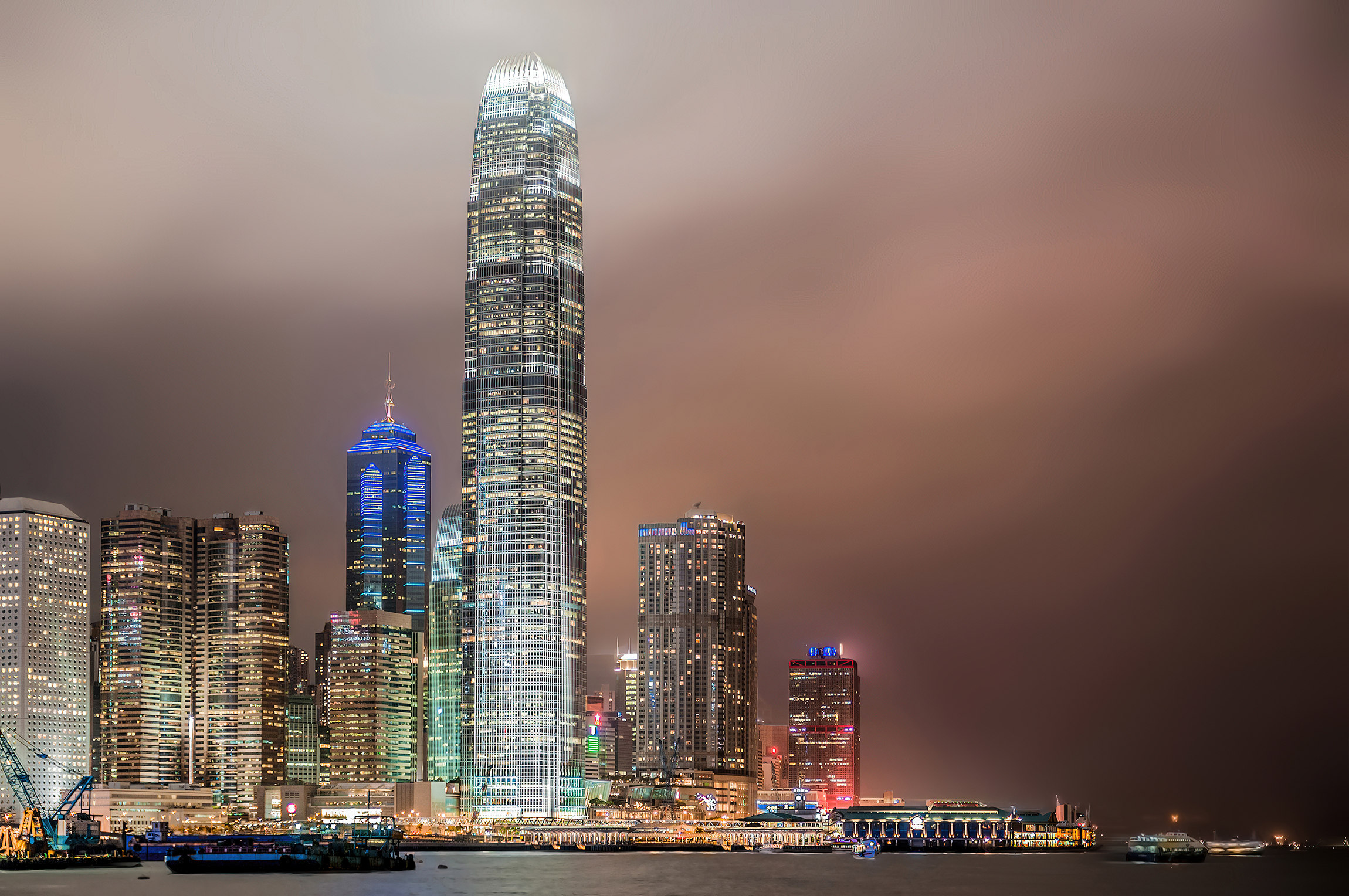
Skyscrapers of Hong Kong

Skylines may be ranked based on subjective criteria. Skylines are often ranked by height and size, such as by the number of buildings taller than a certain height. The article list of cities with the most skyscrapers ranks cities based on the number of skyscrapers that are taller than 150 metres (490 ft).

Emporis was one such service, which used height and other data to give point values to buildings and added them together for skylines. The three cities it ranked highest in 2012 were Hong Kong, New York City, and Singapore.

== See also ==
- Cityscape
- Skyscraper Index
- List of cities with the most skyscrapers
