= Jason Barr =

American economist

Jason M. Barr is an American economist and author at Rutgers University-Newark, whose work is in the field of "skynomics", the study of skyscrapers and skylines using modern economics methods. He is the author of Building the Skyline: The Birth and Growth of Manhattan's Skyscrapers, which chronicled the history of the Manhattan skyline from an economic perspective.

== Biography ==
Barr earned his B.S. from Cornell University in 1992, his M.F.A. in creative writing from Emerson College in 1995 and his Ph.D. in economics from Columbia University in 2002.

== Research ==
Barr's work has addressed widely held myths or misconceptions about skyscrapers and cities. For example, research performed by Barr and his colleagues showed that there was no evidence for the Skyscraper Curse, that the completion of the world's tallest building is a herald of an economic crisis. Barr has also debunked the misconception that Manhattan's geological conditions have been the reason there are few skyscrapers between lower Manhattan and Midtown. Rather, Barr's work demonstrates that Midtown's origin was due to the city's demographic evolution and the fact that Manhattan is a long, but narrow, island that concentrated economic activity to a much greater degree, as compared to other cities.

== Books ==
- Building the Skyline: The Birth and Growth of Manhattan's Skyscrapers. Oxford University Press, 2016. ISBN 978-0199344369
- Economic Drivers: Skyscrapers in China. Council on Tall Buildings and Urban Habitat, 2017. ISBN 978-0939493555.
