= Petronas Towers =

Interlinked supertall skyscraper in Kuala Lumpur, Malaysia

Coordinates: 3°09′28″N 101°42′42″E

- Malay: Menara Berkembar Petronas

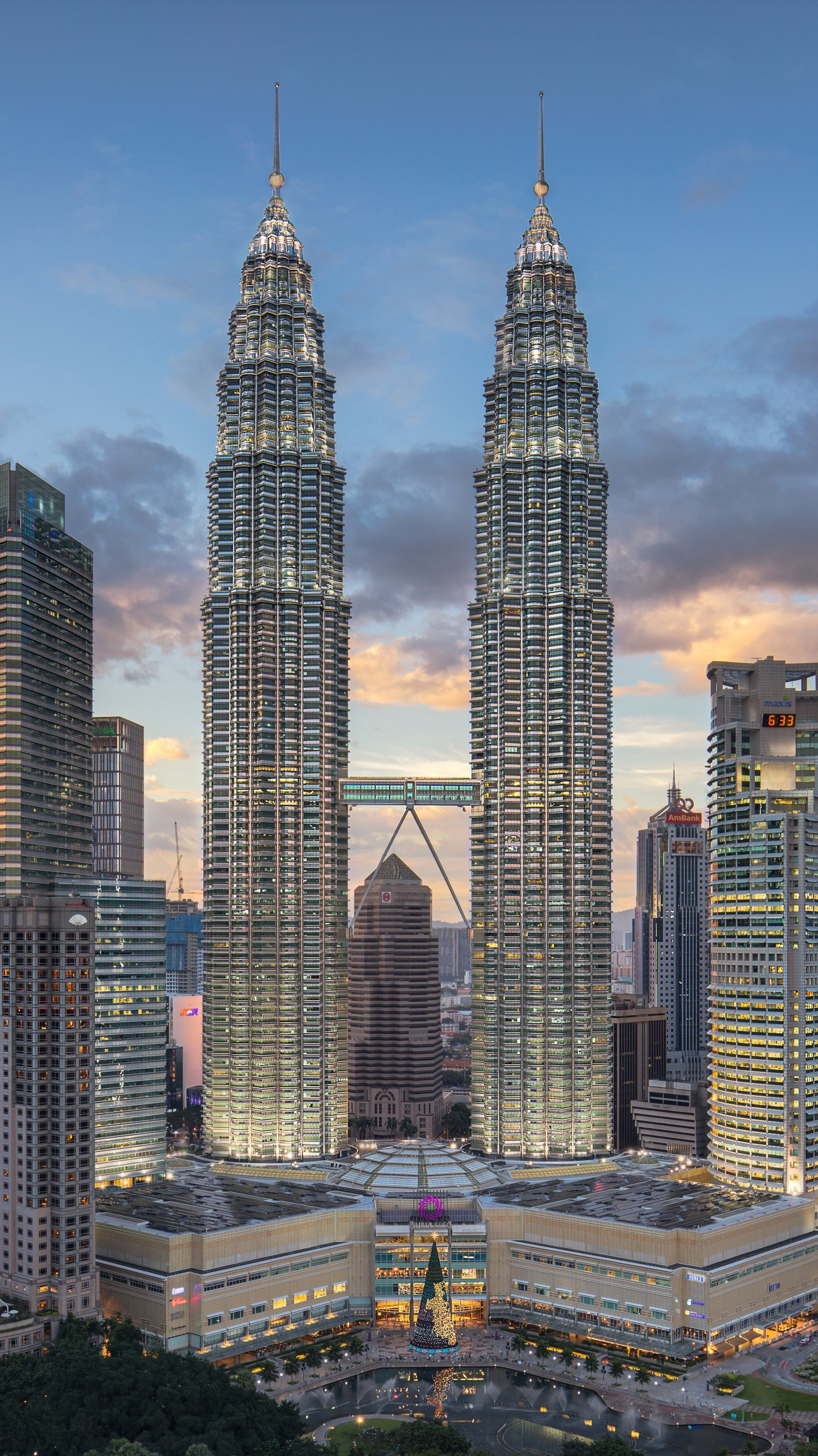
- The Petronas Towers in 2019
- Alternative names: Petronas Twin Towers, KLCC Twin Towers

Record height
- Tallest in the world from 1998 to 2004 (Note: Disputed. CTBUH lists Willis Tower as taller than the Petronas Towers when measured by tip height, roof height, and highest occupied floor.)^{[I]}
- Preceded by: Willis Tower
- Surpassed by: Taipei 101

General information
- Status: Completed
- Type: Commercial offices and tourist attraction
- Architectural style: Postmodern Islamic architecture
- Location: Jalan Ampang, Kuala Lumpur, Malaysia, Malaysia
- Groundbreaking: 1 January 1992; 34 years ago
- Construction started: 1 March 1993; 33 years ago
- Completed: June 1996; 30 years ago
- Opened: 31 August 1999; 27 years ago
- Inaugurated: 31 August 1999; 27 years ago
- Renovated: 16 September 2011; 15 years ago
- Cost: US$1.6 billion
- Owner: KLCC Holdings Sdn Bhd

Height
- Architectural: 451.9 m (1,483 ft)
- Tip: 451.9 m (1,483 ft)
- Antenna spire: 46.4 m (152 ft)
- Roof: 405.5 m (1,330 ft)
- Top floor: 375 m (1,230 ft) (Level 88)
- Observatory: 370 m (1,210 ft) (Level 86)

Technical details
- Floor count: 88 (with 5 being underground)
- Floor area: 395,000 m^{2} (4,252,000 sq ft)
- Lifts/elevators: 38 (each tower)

Design and construction
- Architects: César Pelli, Adamson Associates Architects (as executive architect)
- Developer: KLCC Holdings Sdn Bhd
- Structural engineer: Thornton Tomasetti & Ranhill Bersekutu
- Main contractor: Tower 1 (West): Hazama Corporation; Tower 2 (East): Samsung C&T Corporation; City Center: B.L. Harbert International

Other information
- Public transit: KJ10 KLCC LRT station

Website
- petronastwintowers.com.my

The Petronas Towers (Malay: Menara Berkembar Petronas), also known as the Petronas Twin Towers and colloquially the KLCC Twin Towers, are an interlinked pair of 88-storey supertall skyscrapers in Kuala Lumpur, Malaysia, standing at 451.9 m (1,483 ft). From 1998 to 2004, they were the tallest buildings in the world until they were surpassed by the Taipei 101 skyscraper in Taiwan. The Petronas Towers remain the world's tallest twin skyscrapers, surpassing the original World Trade Center towers in New York City, and were the tallest buildings in Malaysia until 2019, when they were surpassed by The Exchange 106. The Petronas Towers are a major landmark of Kuala Lumpur, along with the nearby Kuala Lumpur Tower and Merdeka 118, and are visible in many places across the city.

== History and architecture ==
The Petronas Towers' structural system is a tube in tube design, invented by Bangladeshi-American architect Fazlur Rahman Khan. Applying a tube-structure for extremely tall buildings is a common phenomenon. The 88-floor towers are constructed largely of reinforced concrete, with a steel and glass facade designed to resemble motifs found in Islamic art, a reflection of Malaysia's Muslim religion. Another Islamic influence on the design is that the cross section of the towers is based on a Rub el Hizb, albeit with circular sectors added to meet office space requirements. The circular sectors are similar to the bottom part of the Qutb Minar.

Development of the Petronas Towers Tower 1 level 43 floor plan from a Rub el Hizb symbol

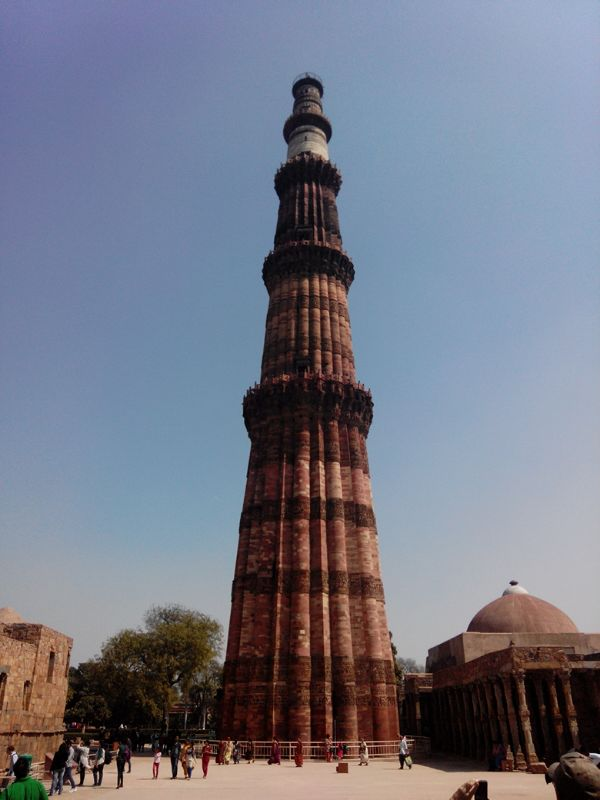
The cross section of the Petronas Towers is based on a Rub el Hizb, albeit with circular sectors similar to the bottom part of the Qutb Minar.

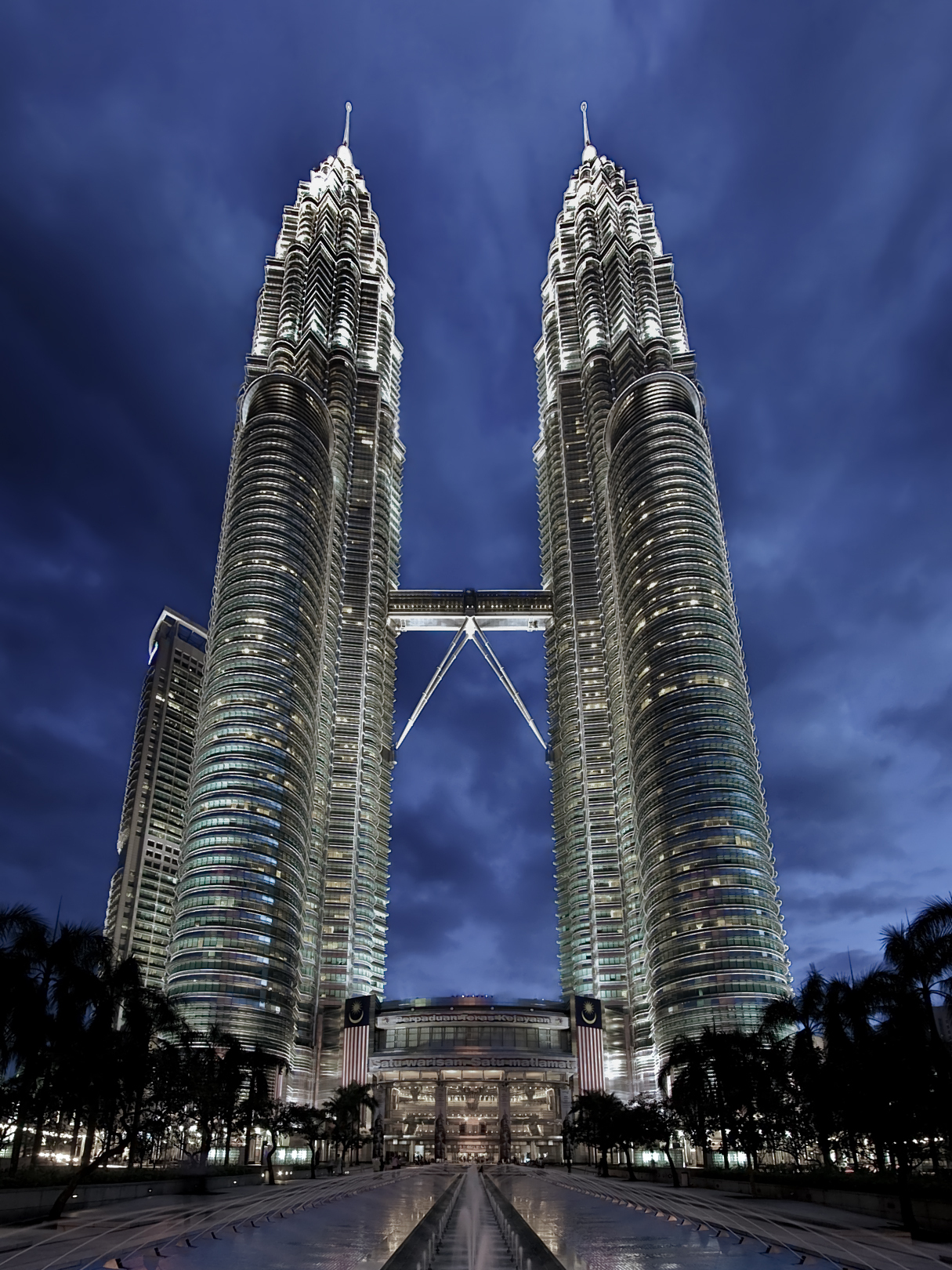
The Petronas Towers at night, 2008

The towers were designed by Argentine-American architect César Pelli. A distinctive postmodern style was chosen to create a 21st-century icon for Kuala Lumpur, Malaysia. Planning on the Petronas Towers started on 1 January 1992 and included rigorous tests and simulations of wind and structural loads on the design. Seven years of construction followed at the former site of the original Selangor Turf Club, beginning on 1 March 1993 with excavation, which involved moving 500 truckloads of earth every night to dig down 30 m (98 ft) below the surface. The construction of the superstructure commenced on 1 April 1994. Interiors with furniture were completed on 1 January 1996, the spires of Tower 1 and Tower 2 were completed on 1 March 1996, 3 years after its construction was started, and the first batch of Petronas personnel moved into the building on 1 January 1997. The building was officially opened by the Prime Minister of Malaysia, Tun Dr. Mahathir bin Mohamad, on 31 August 1999. The twin towers were built on the site of Kuala Lumpur's race track. It was the tallest structure in Malaysia at the time of its completion. Test boreholes found that the original construction site effectively sat on the edge of a cliff. One half of the site was decayed limestone while the other half was soft rock. The entire site was moved 61 m (200 ft) to allow the buildings to sit entirely on the soft rock. Because of the depth of the bedrock, the buildings were built on the world's deepest foundations. 104 concrete piles, ranging from 60 to 114 m (197 to 374 ft) deep, were bored into the ground. The concrete raft foundation, comprising 13,200 m^{3} (470,000 cu ft) of concrete was continuously poured through a period of 54 hours for each tower. The raft is 4.6 m (15 ft) thick, weighs 32,500 t (35,800 tons) and held the world record for the largest concrete pour until 2007. The foundations were completed within 12 months by Bachy Soletanche and required massive amounts of concrete.

As a result of the Malaysian government specifying that the buildings be completed in six years, two construction consortia were hired to meet the deadline, one for each tower. Tower 1, the west tower (left in the top-right photograph) was built by a Japanese consortium led by the Hazama Corporation (JA Jones Construction Co., MMC Engineering Services Sdn Bhd, Ho Hup Construction Co. Bhd and Mitsubishi Corp) while Tower 2, the east tower (right in the top-right photograph) was built by a South Korean consortium led by the Samsung C&T Corporation (Kukdong Engineering & Construction and Syarikat Jasatera Sdn Bhd).

Early into construction a batch of concrete failed a routine strength test causing construction to come to a complete halt. All the completed floors were tested but it was found that only one had used a bad batch and it was demolished. As a result of the concrete failure, each new batch was tested before being poured. The halt in construction had cost US$700,000 per day and led to three separate concrete plants being set up on the site to ensure that if one produced a bad batch, the other two could continue to supply concrete. The sky bridge contract was completed by Kukdong Engineering & Construction. Tower 2 (Samsung C&T) became the first to reach the world's tallest building at the time.

Due to the huge cost of importing steel, the towers were constructed on a cheaper radical design of super high-strength reinforced concrete. High-strength concrete is a material familiar to Asian contractors and twice as effective as steel in sway reduction; however, it makes the building twice as heavy on its foundation as a comparable steel building. Supported by 23-by-23-metre (75 ft × 75 ft) concrete cores and an outer ring of widely spaced super columns, the towers use a sophisticated structural system that accommodates its slender profile and provides 560,000 m^{2} (6,000,000 sq ft) of column-free office space. Below the twin towers is Suria KLCC, a shopping mall, and Petronas Philharmonic Hall, the home of the Malaysian Philharmonic Orchestra.

=== Notable events ===
- On 15 April 1999, Felix Baumgartner set the world record for BASE jumping (since broken) by jumping off a window cleaning crane on the Petronas Towers.
- Thousands of people were evacuated on 12 September 2001 after a bomb threat the day after the September 11 attacks destroyed the World Trade Center towers in New York City. Bomb disposal squads found no explosives in the towers, but they nevertheless evacuated the premises. Workers and shoppers were allowed to return three hours later, around noon. No one was hurt during the evacuation.
- On the evening of 4 November 2005, a fire broke out in the cinema complex of the Suria KLCC shopping centre below the Petronas Towers, triggering panic among patrons. There were no reports of injuries. The buildings were largely empty, except the shopping mall, Suria KLCC, because of the late hour; the only people involved were moviegoers and some diners in restaurants.
- On the morning of 1 September 2009, French urban climber Alain "Spiderman" Robert, using only his bare hands and feet and with no safety devices, scaled to the top of Tower Two in just under 2 hours after two previous efforts had ended in arrest. In his first attempt on 20 March 1997, police arrested him at the 60th floor, 28 floors away from the "summit". His second attempt, on 20 March 2007, exactly 10 years later, was also stopped on the same floor, though on the other tower.

== Anchor tenants ==
Tower One is fully occupied by Petronas and a number of its subsidiaries and associate companies, while the office spaces in Tower Two are mostly available for lease to other companies. A number of companies have offices in Tower Two, including SapuraOMV Upstream (Sarawak) Inc., Huawei Technologies, AVEVA, Al Jazeera English, Carigali Hess, Bloomberg News, Bloomberg Television, Boeing, IBM, Khazanah Nasional Berhad, McKinsey & Co, WIPRO Limited, TCS, HCLTech, Krawler, Microsoft, The Agency (a modelling company) and Reuters.

== Features ==
=== Suria KLCC ===
Suria KLCC is a 140,000 m^{2} (1,500,000 sq ft) upscale retail center at the foot of the Petronas Towers. It features mostly foreign luxury goods and high-street labels. Its attractions include an art gallery, an underwater aquarium and also a Science center. Boasting approximately 300 stores, Suria KLCC is touted as one of the largest shopping malls in Malaysia.

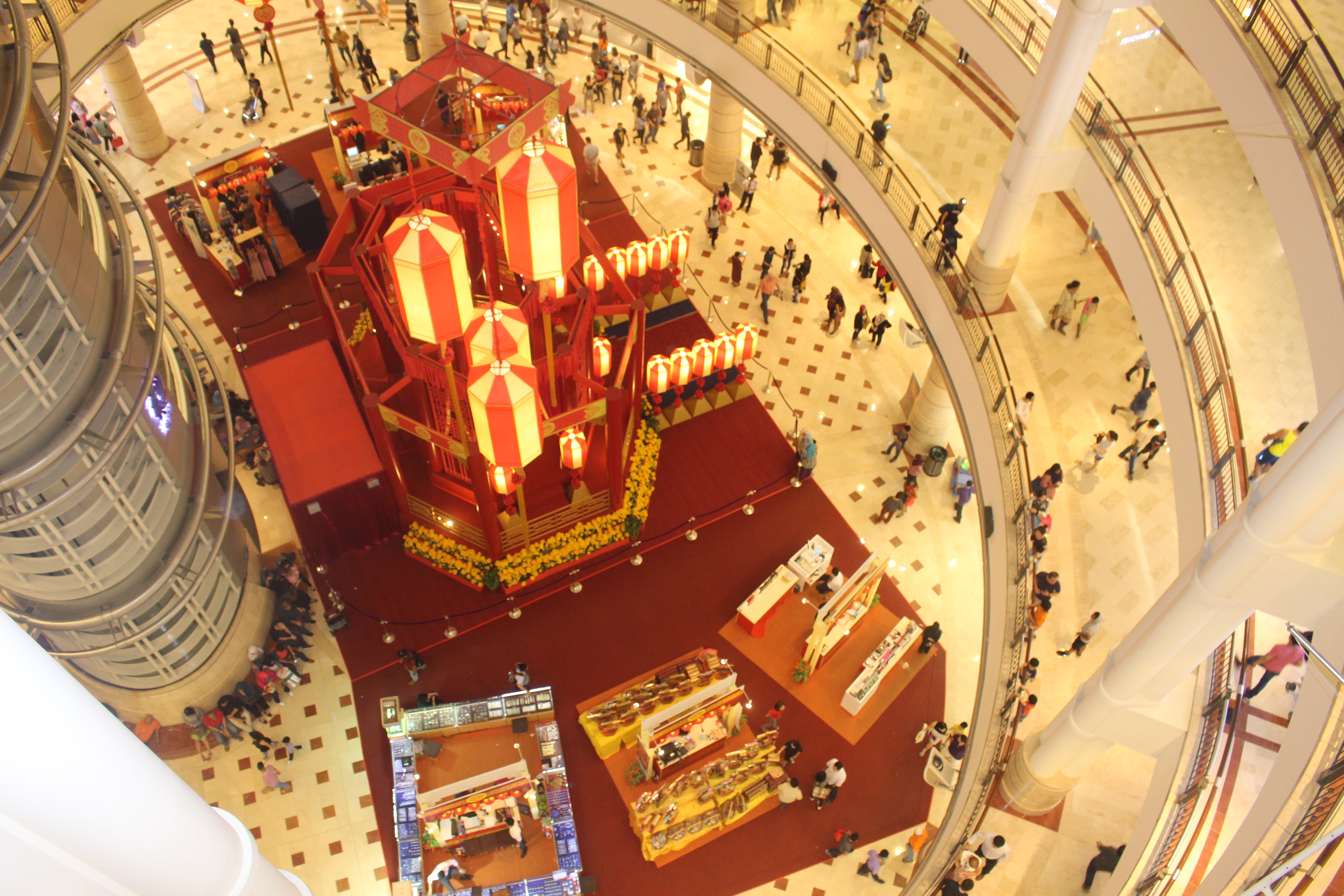
Inside View of Suria KLCC Shopping Centre

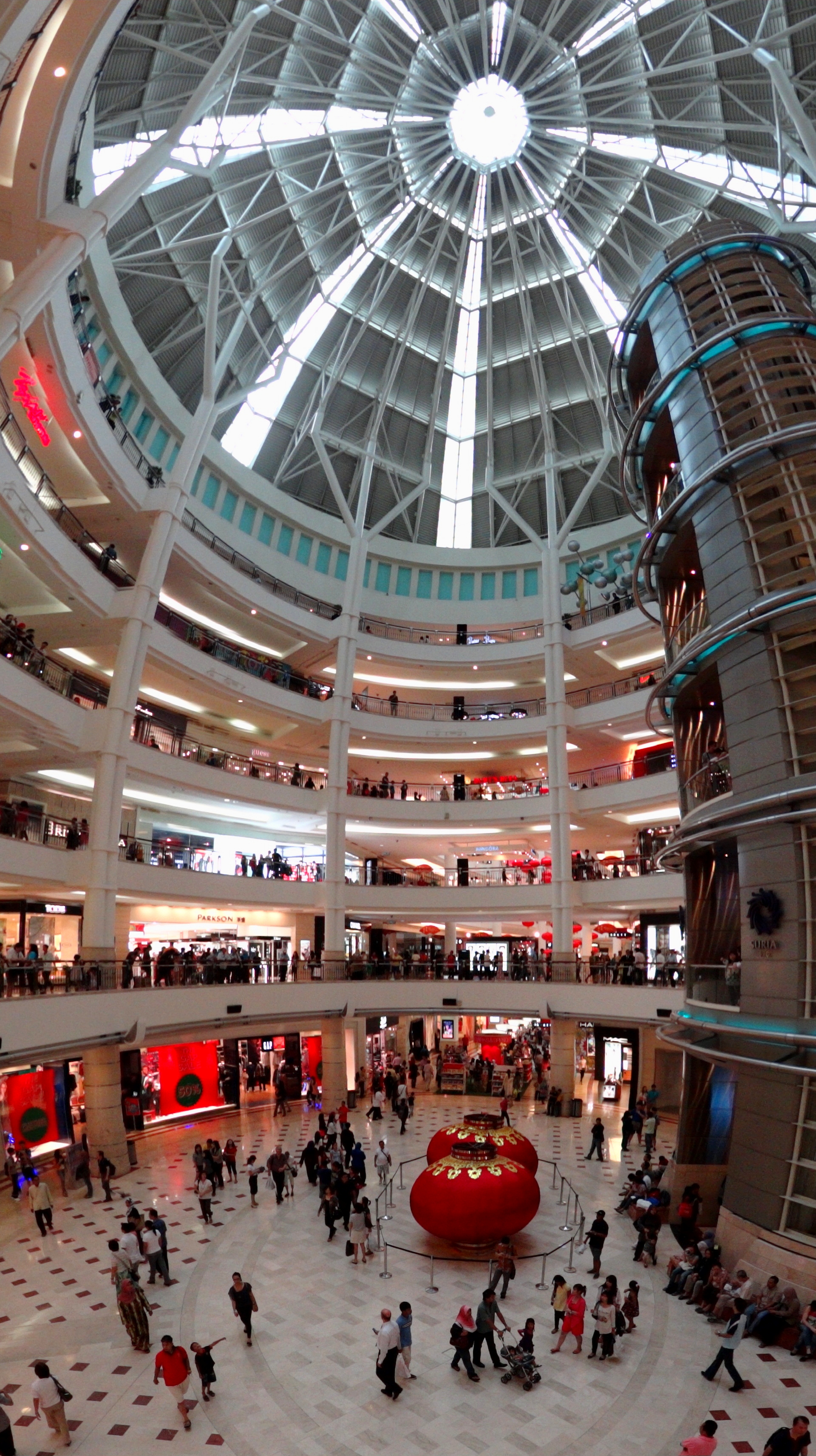
Inside the Suria KLCC

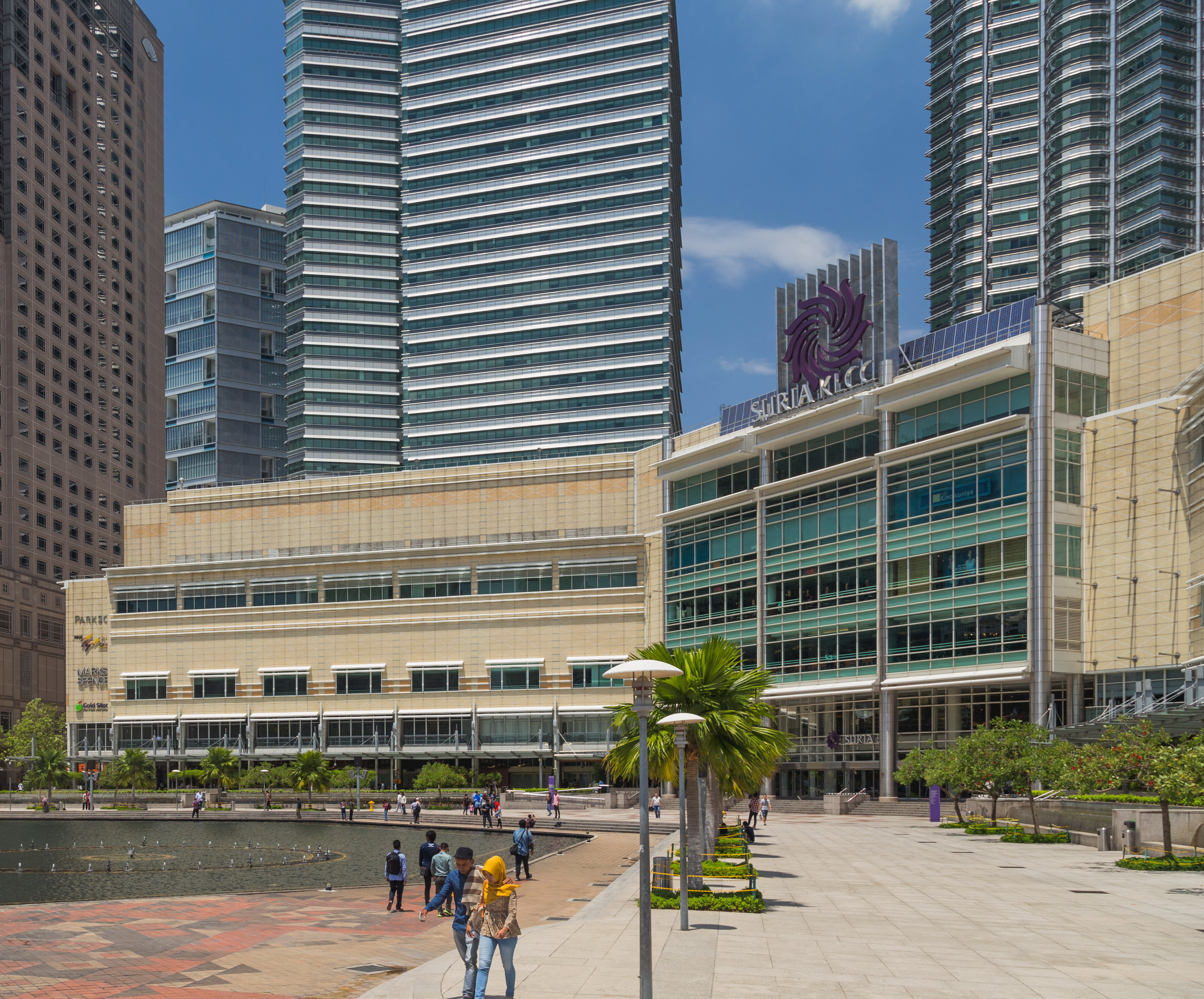
Entrance of Suria KLCC

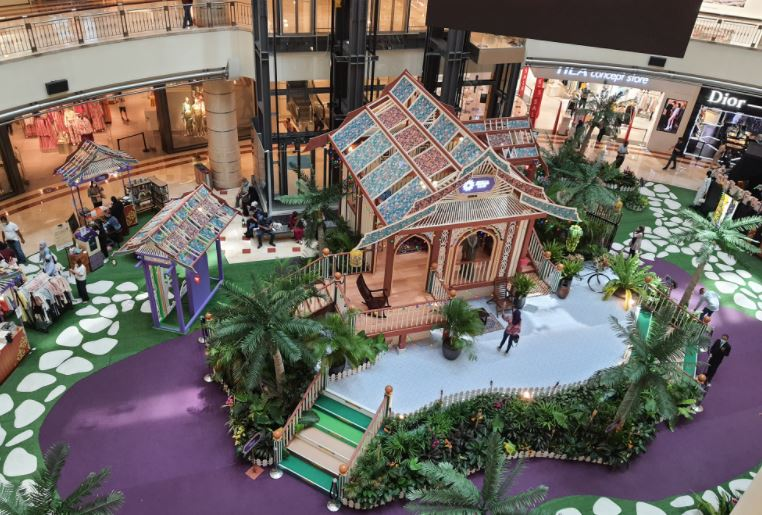
Kampung House decoration at Suria KLCC's centre court for Hari Raya

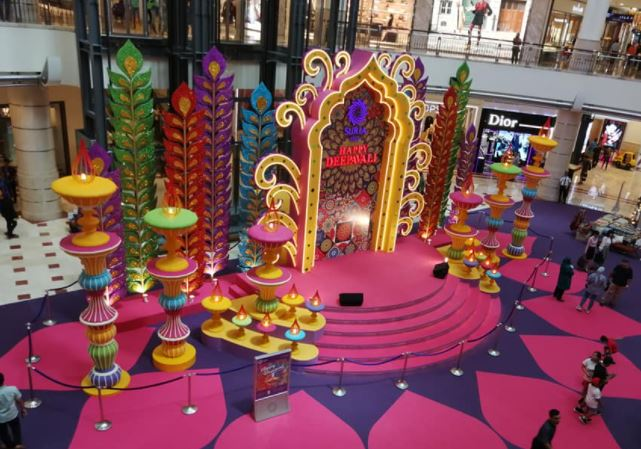
Deepavali decoration at Suria KLCC's centre court

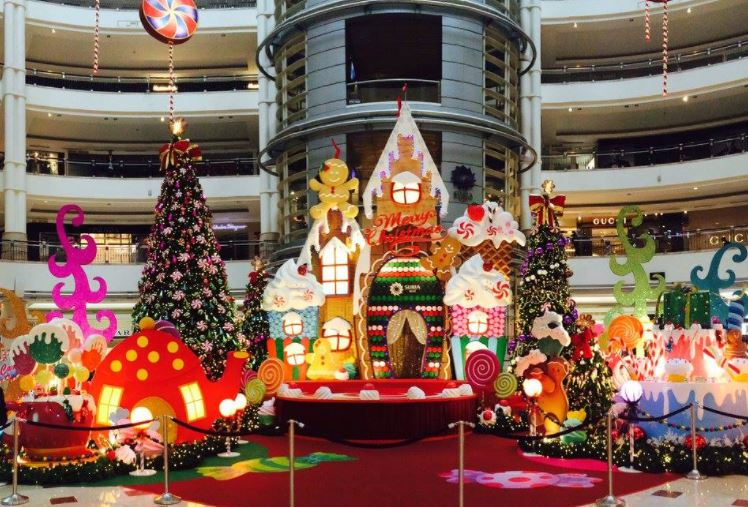
Christmas decoration at Suria KLCC's centre court

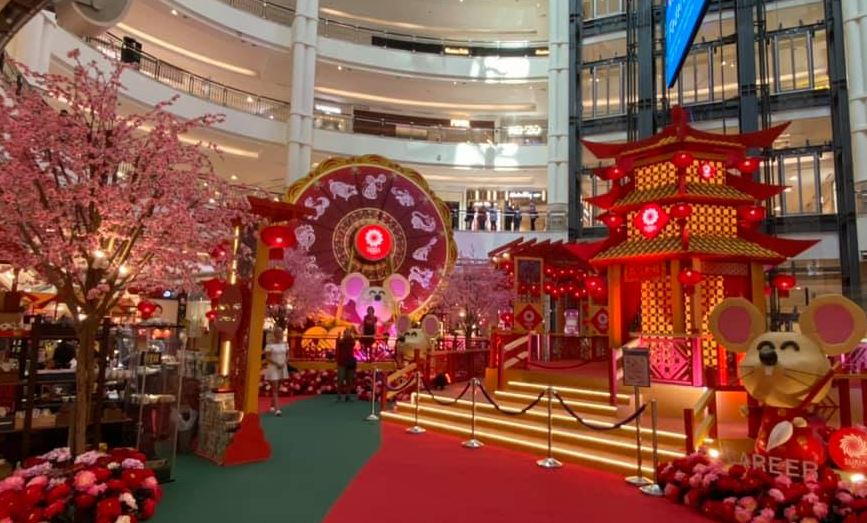
Chinese New Year decoration at Suria KLCC's centre court

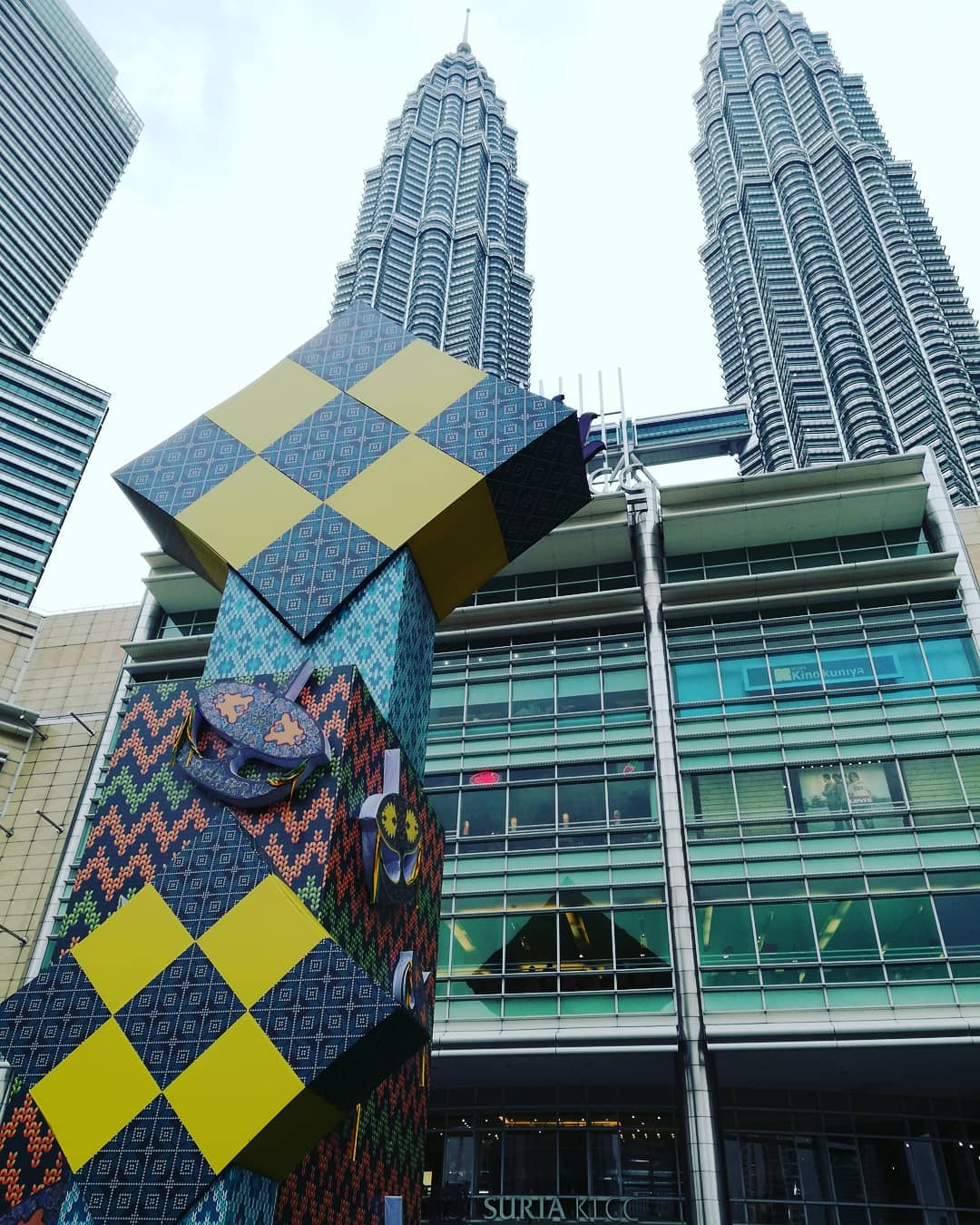
The Tallest Giant "Ketupat" Decoration for Raya at Suria KLCC

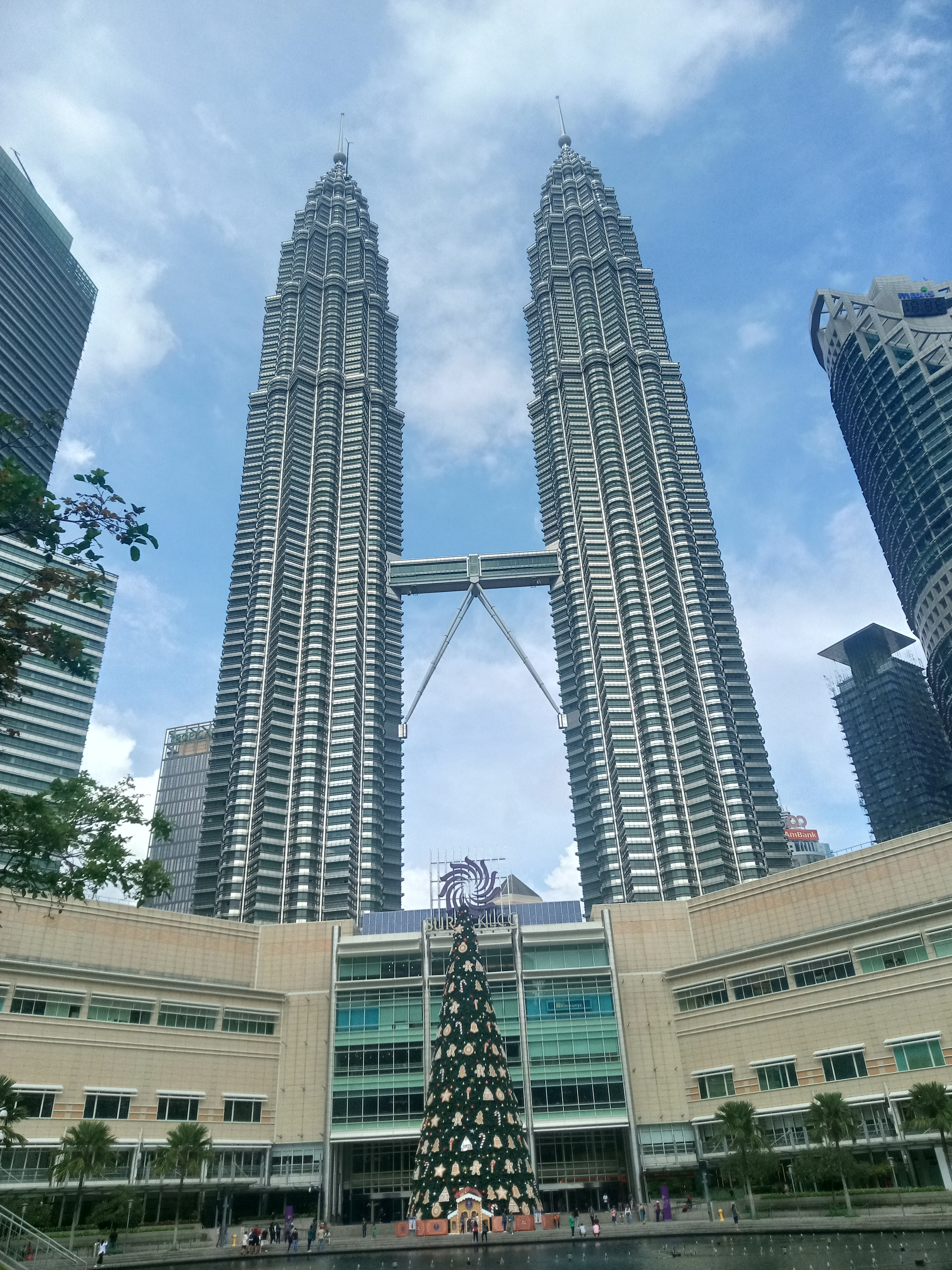
Suria KLCC's entrance with a giant Christmas tree

=== KLCC Park ===
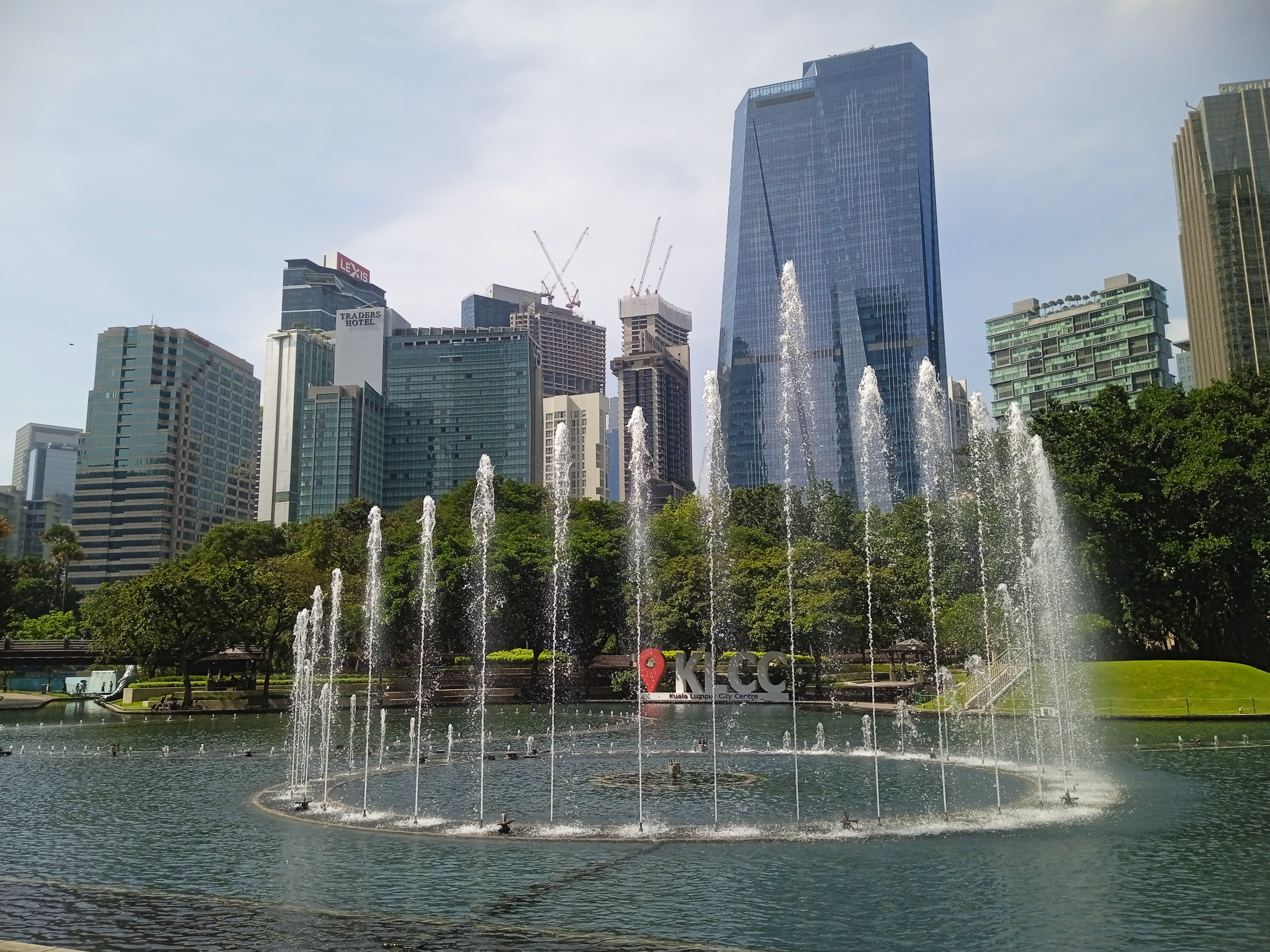
Lake Symphony at KLCC Park

Spanning 6.9 ha (17 acres) below the building is the KLCC Park with jogging and walking paths, a fountain with incorporated light show, wading pools, and a children's playground.

=== Skybridge ===
A double decker skybridge connects the two towers on the 41st and 42nd floors, holding the record for the highest 2-story bridge in the world. The skybridge also functions as a crucial design feature facilitating movement between the two towers during high winds. The bridge is 170 m (558 ft) above the ground and 58.4 m (192 ft) long, weighing 750 t (830 tons). The same floor is also known as the podium, since visitors going to higher levels have to change elevators here. Dynamic analyses were performed and iterated to support the final design by studying the structural behavior of the twin towers to time-varying loads such as earthquakes and wind. The skybridge is open to all visitors, but tickets are limited to about 1,000 people per day, with around half available to be purchased online, and the other half obtained on a first-come, first-served basis. Petronas began selling tickets in 2010, eliminating free visits. Visitors can choose to opt for package one which is just a visit to the skybridge or go for package two to go to the skybridge and all the way to level 86. Visitors are only allowed on the 41st floor as the 42nd floor can only be used by the tenants of the building.

The skybridge also acts as a safety device, so that in the event of a fire or other emergency in one tower, tenants can evacuate by crossing the skybridge to the other tower. The total evacuation triggered by a bomb hoax on 12 September 2001 (the day after the September 11 attacks destroyed the twin towers of the World Trade Center in New York City) showed that the bridge would not be useful if both towers need to be emptied simultaneously, as the capacity of the staircases was insufficient for such an event. Plans thus call for the lifts to be used if both towers need to be evacuated, and a successful drill following the revised plan was conducted in 2005.

There is a two hinged arch that supports the skybridge with arch legs, each 51 m (167 ft) long, that are bolted to level 29 of each of the towers. After being constructed on the ground, the skybridge was lifted into place on the towers over a period of three days in July 1995. Residing on the 41st and 42nd floors, the skybridge connects a conference room, an executive dining room and a prayer room.

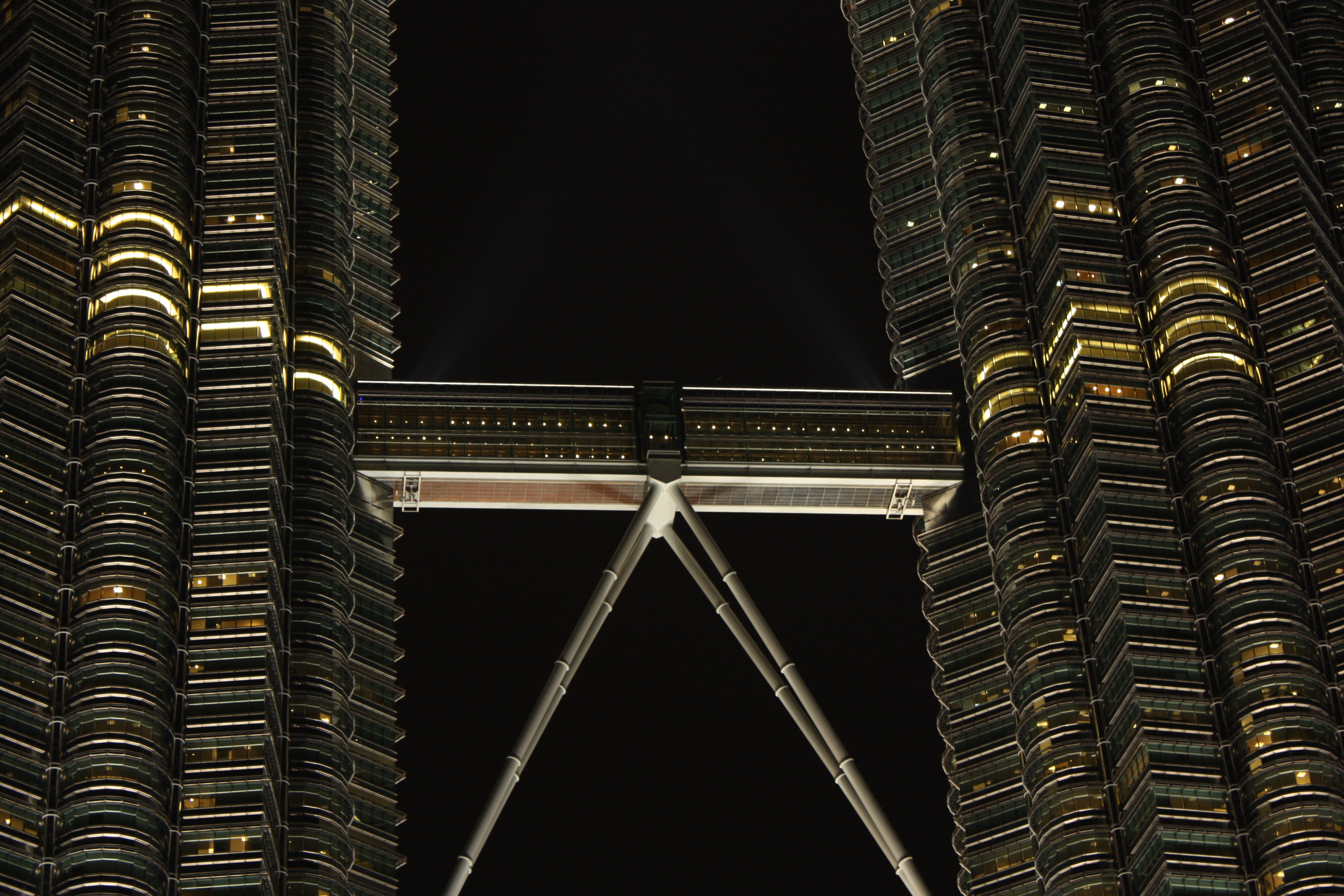
A skybridge connects the two towers

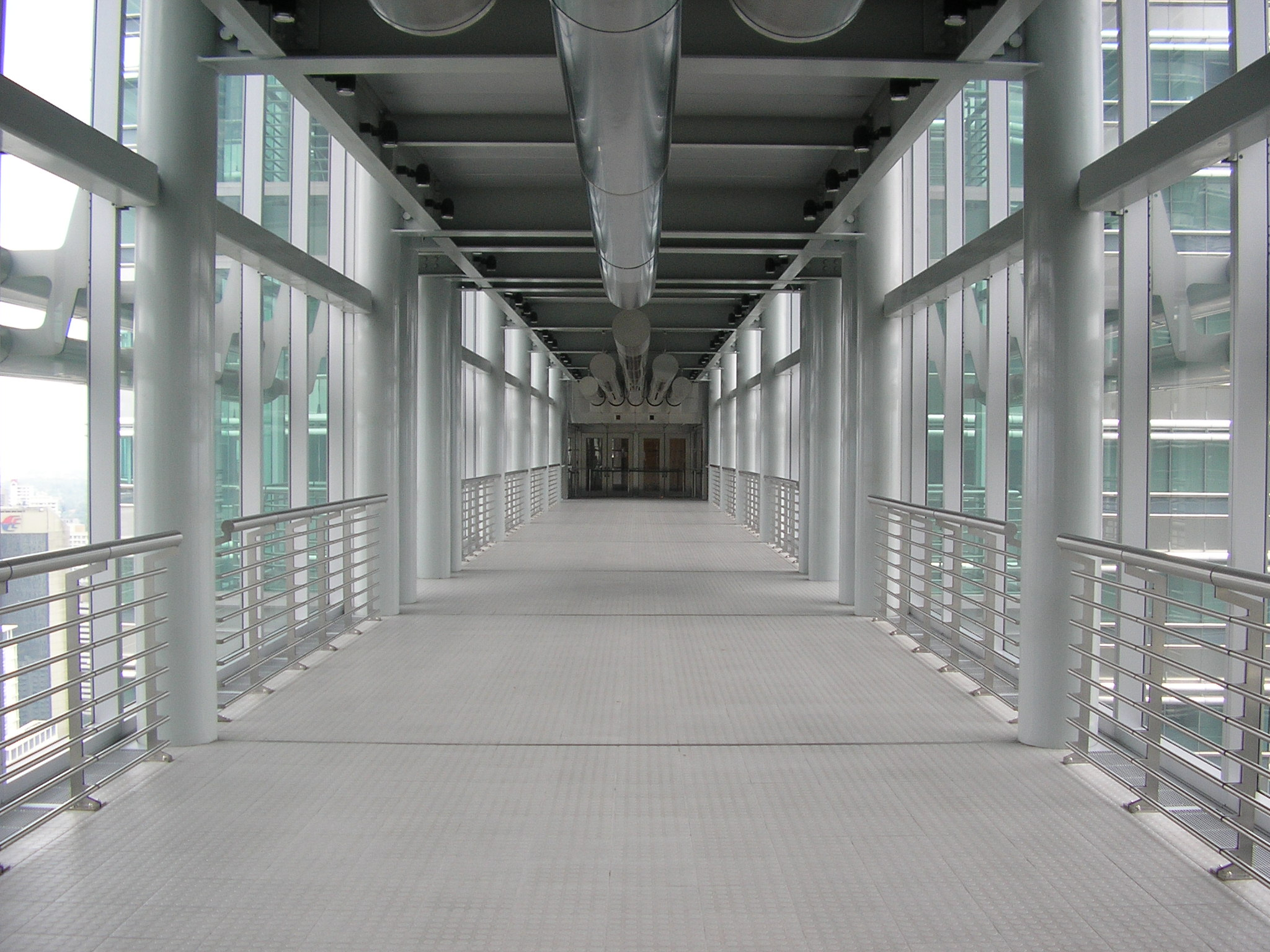
An inside view of the skybridge

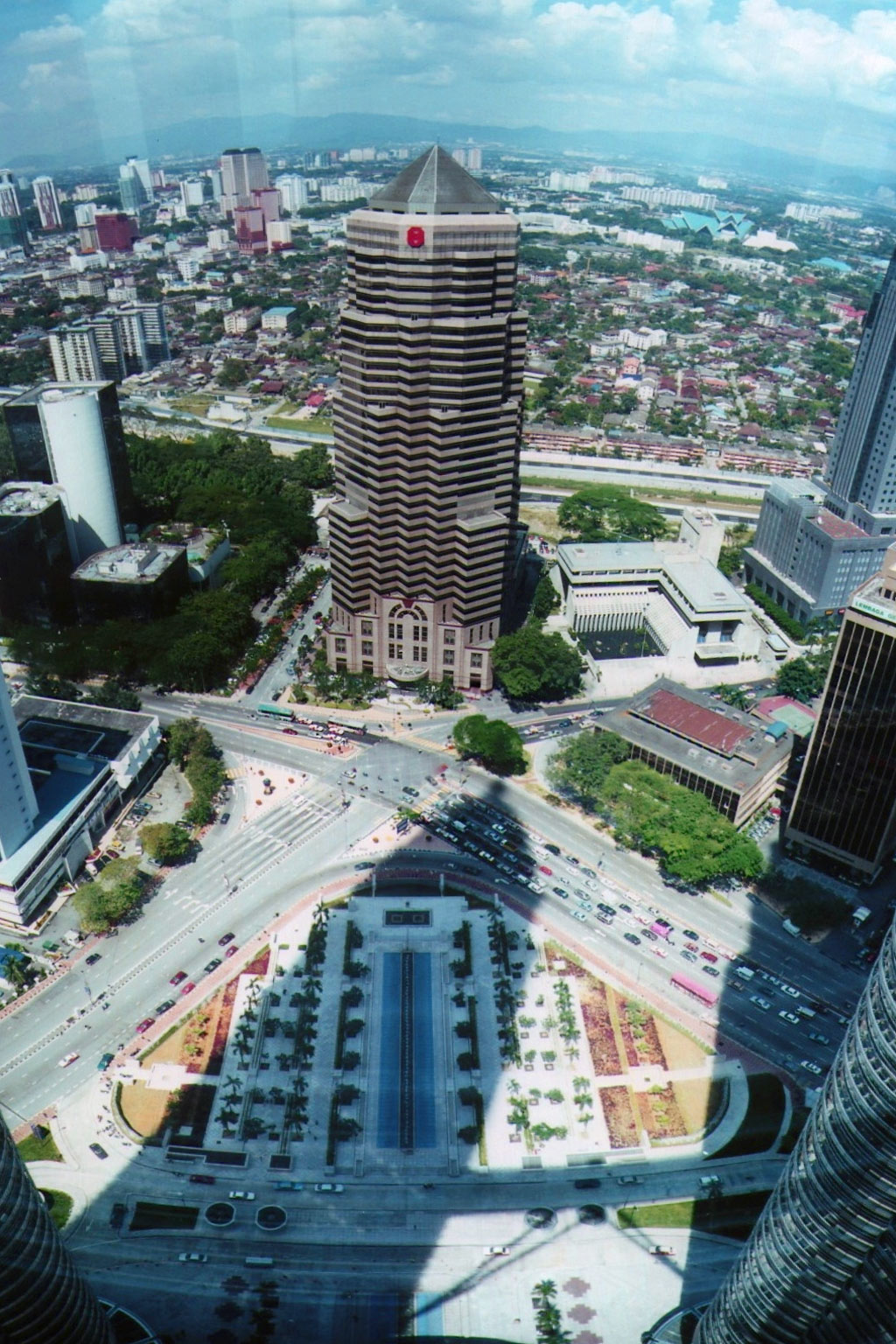
View to the northwest from the Petronas Towers skybridge, including the shadow of Tower 1 and the skybridge, and the Public Bank Berhad building

=== Lift system ===
The main bank of lifts is located in the centre of each tower. All main lifts are double-decker with the lower deck of the lift taking passengers to even-numbered floors and upper deck to odd-numbered floors. To reach an odd-numbered floor from ground level, passengers must take an escalator to the upper deck of the lift.

== Gallery ==
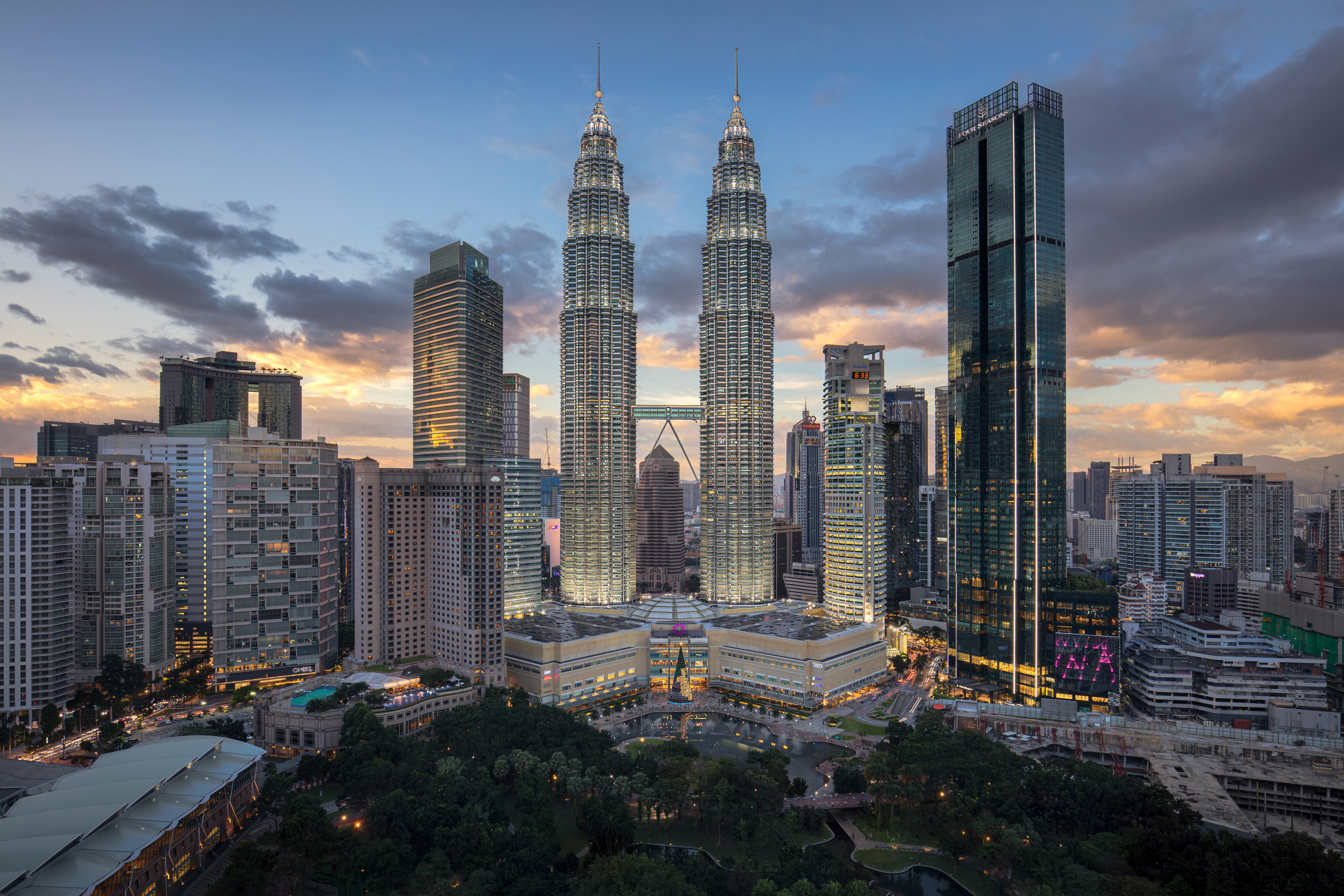
The Petronas Towers with their surroundings in December 2019

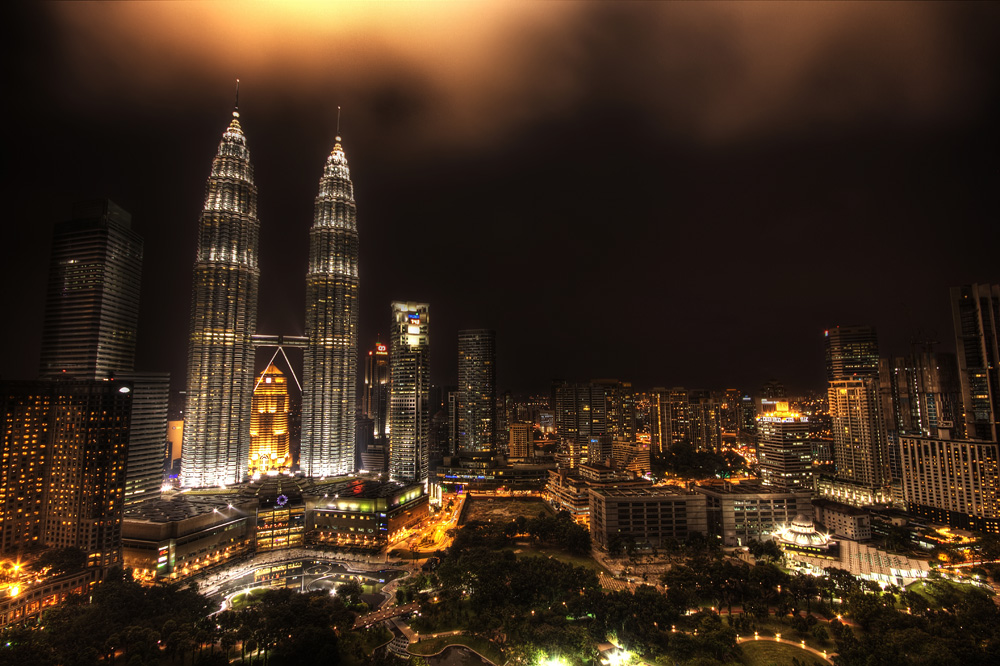
Night view of the Petronas Towers and the surrounding KLCC business district

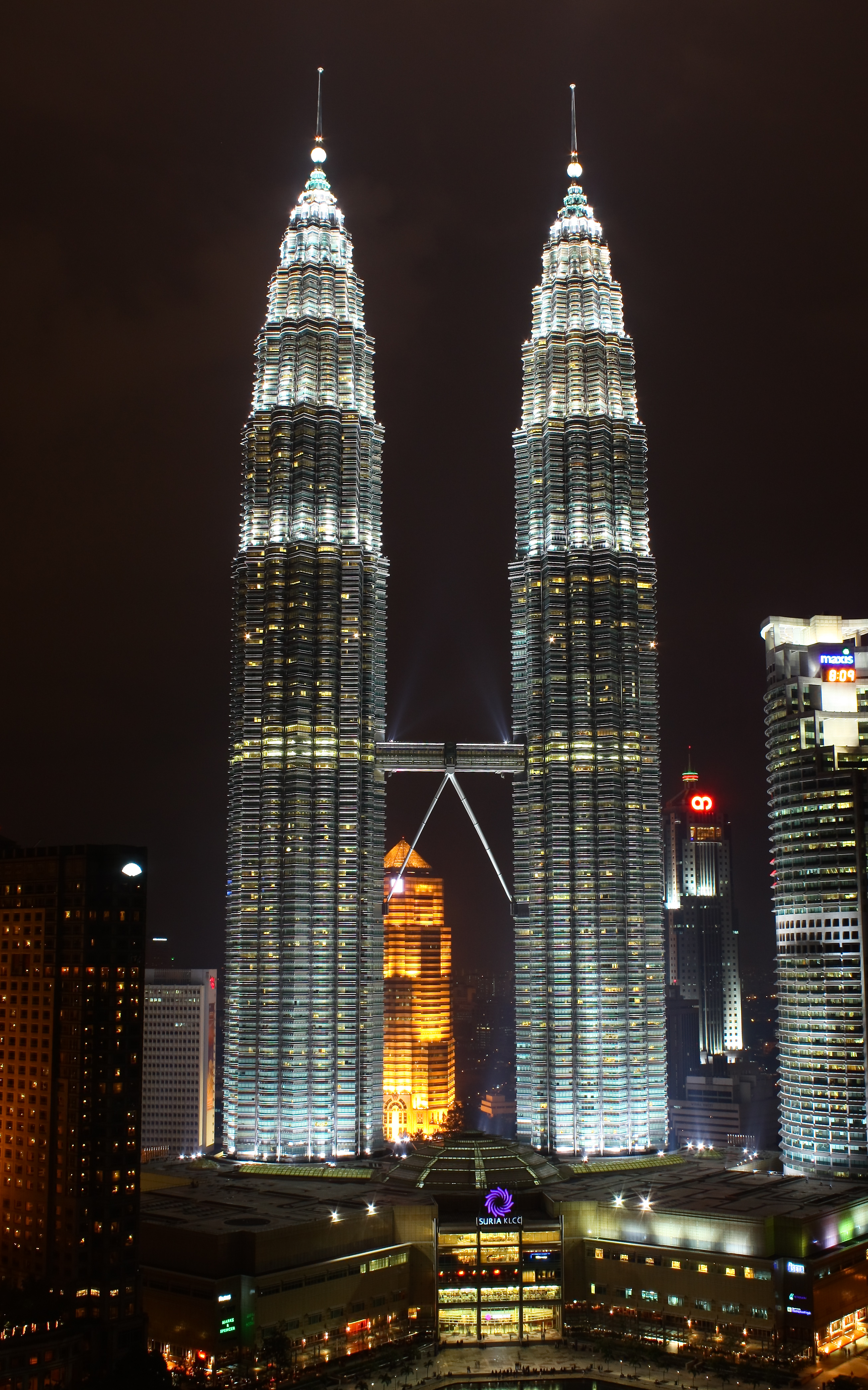
At night from twenty-ninth floor of the Traders Hotel

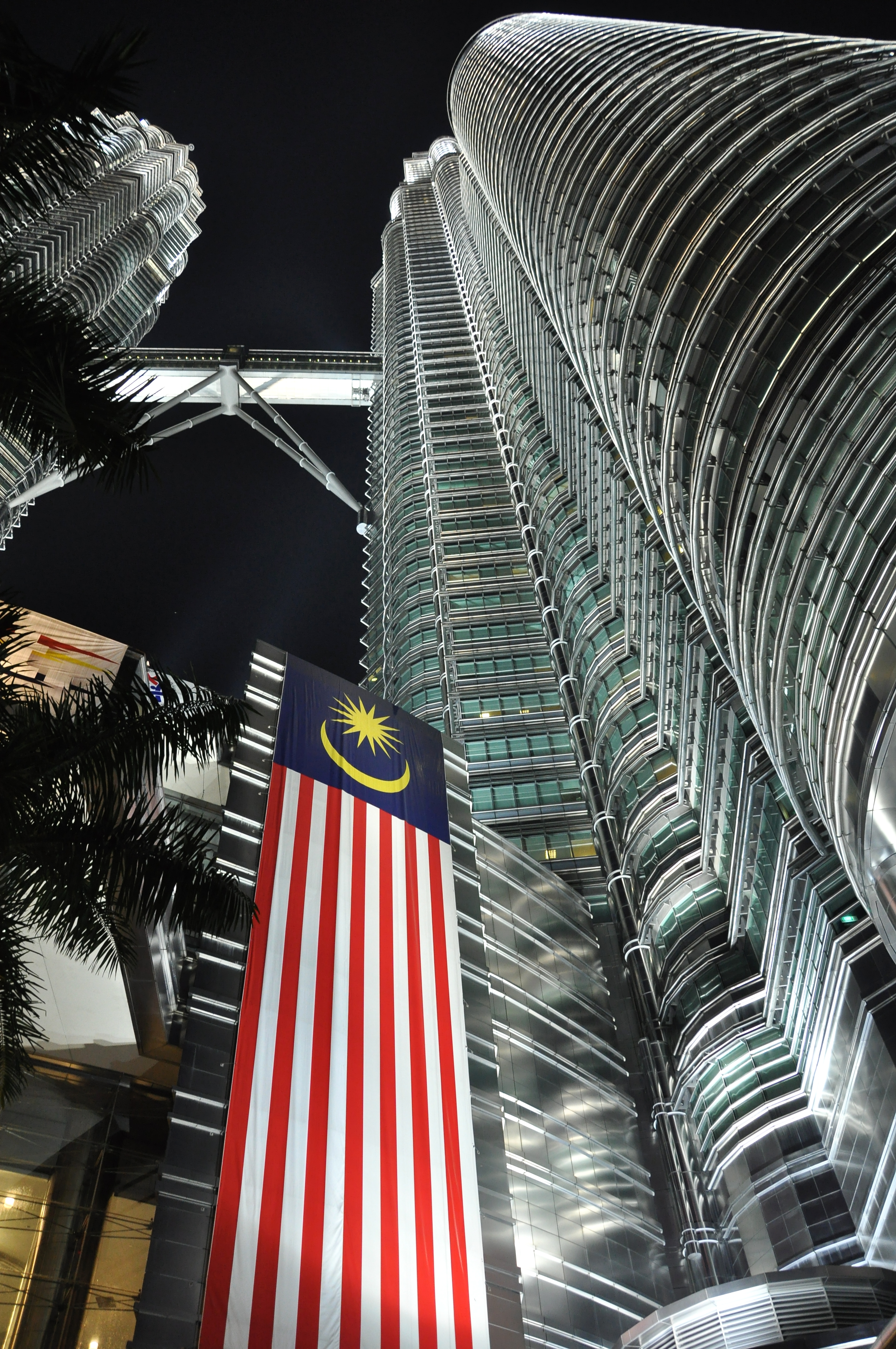
Looking up from the base at night with a Malaysian flag banner

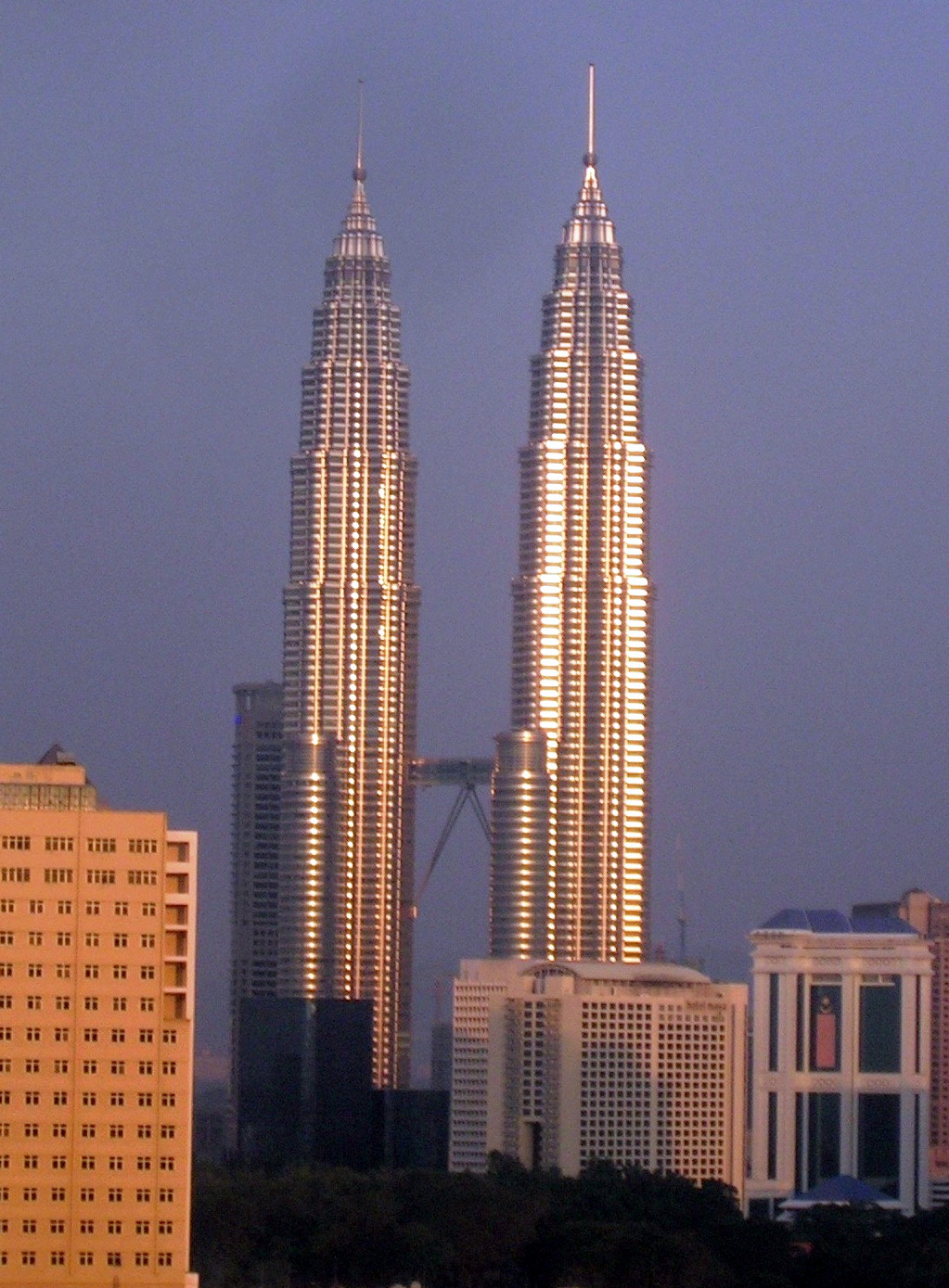
Petronas Towers in Kuala Lumpur, Malaysia at sunset

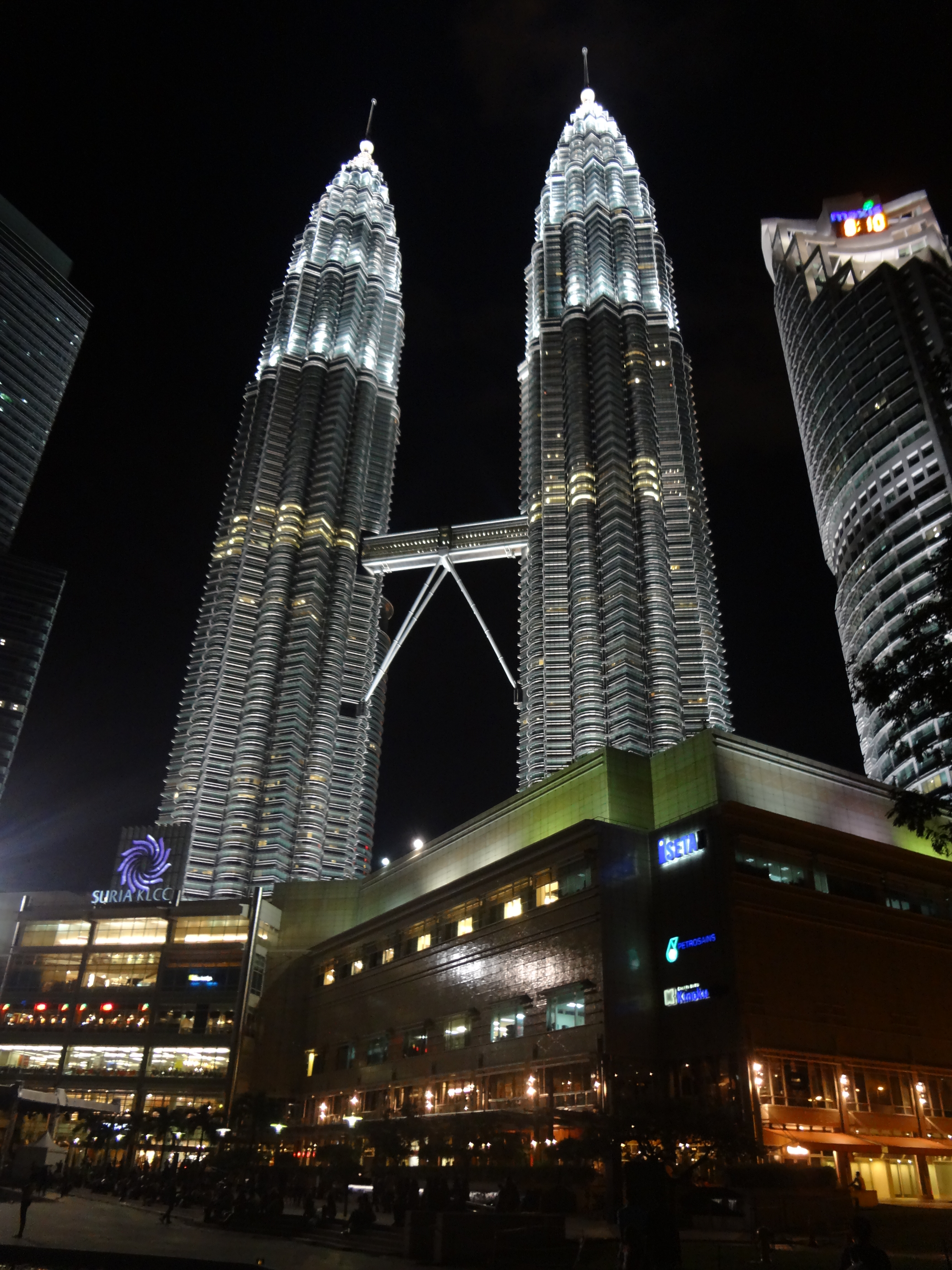
Night image of the Petronas Towers in Kuala Lumpur, taken from behind

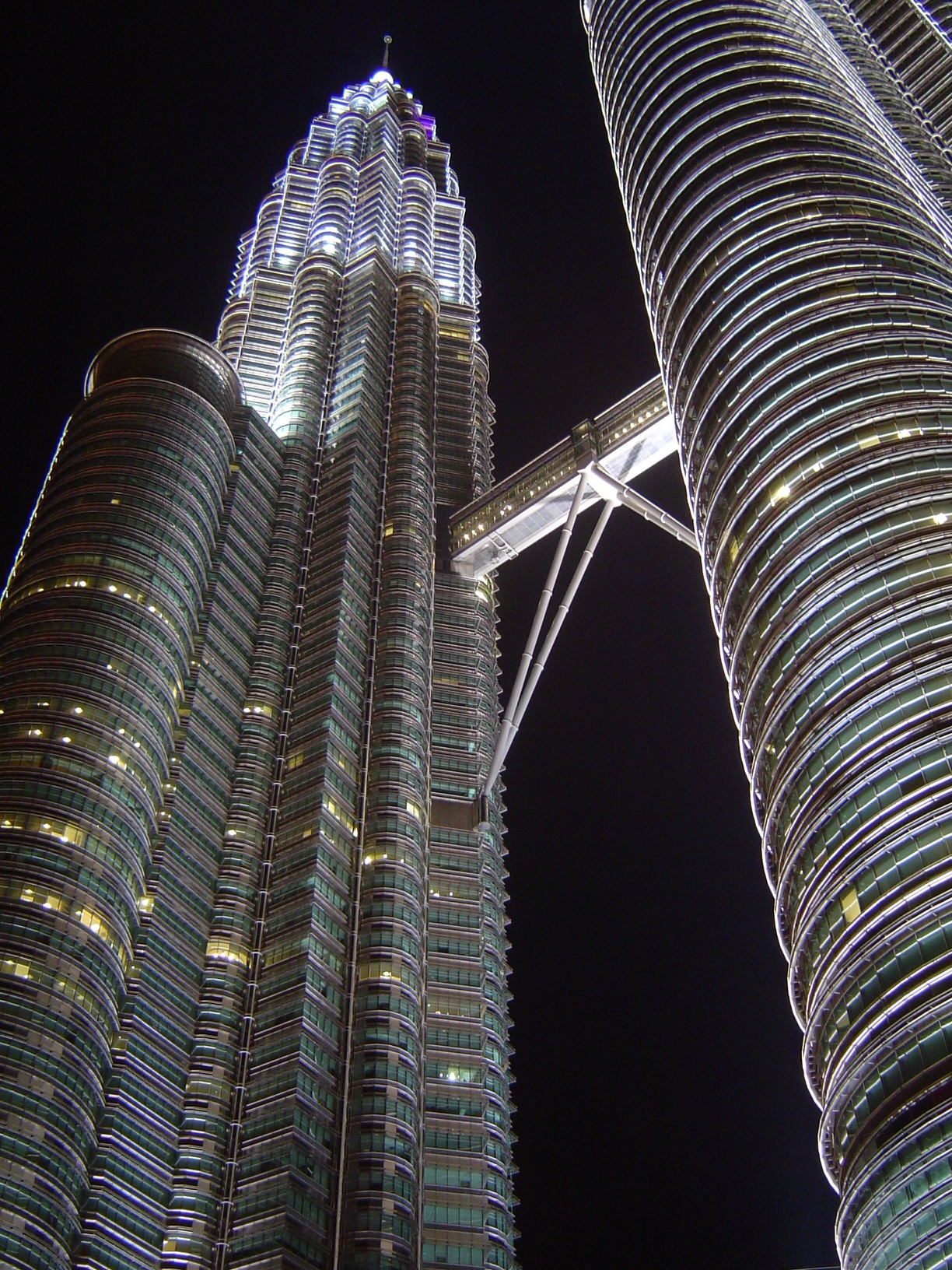
View of Tower 2 from the ground

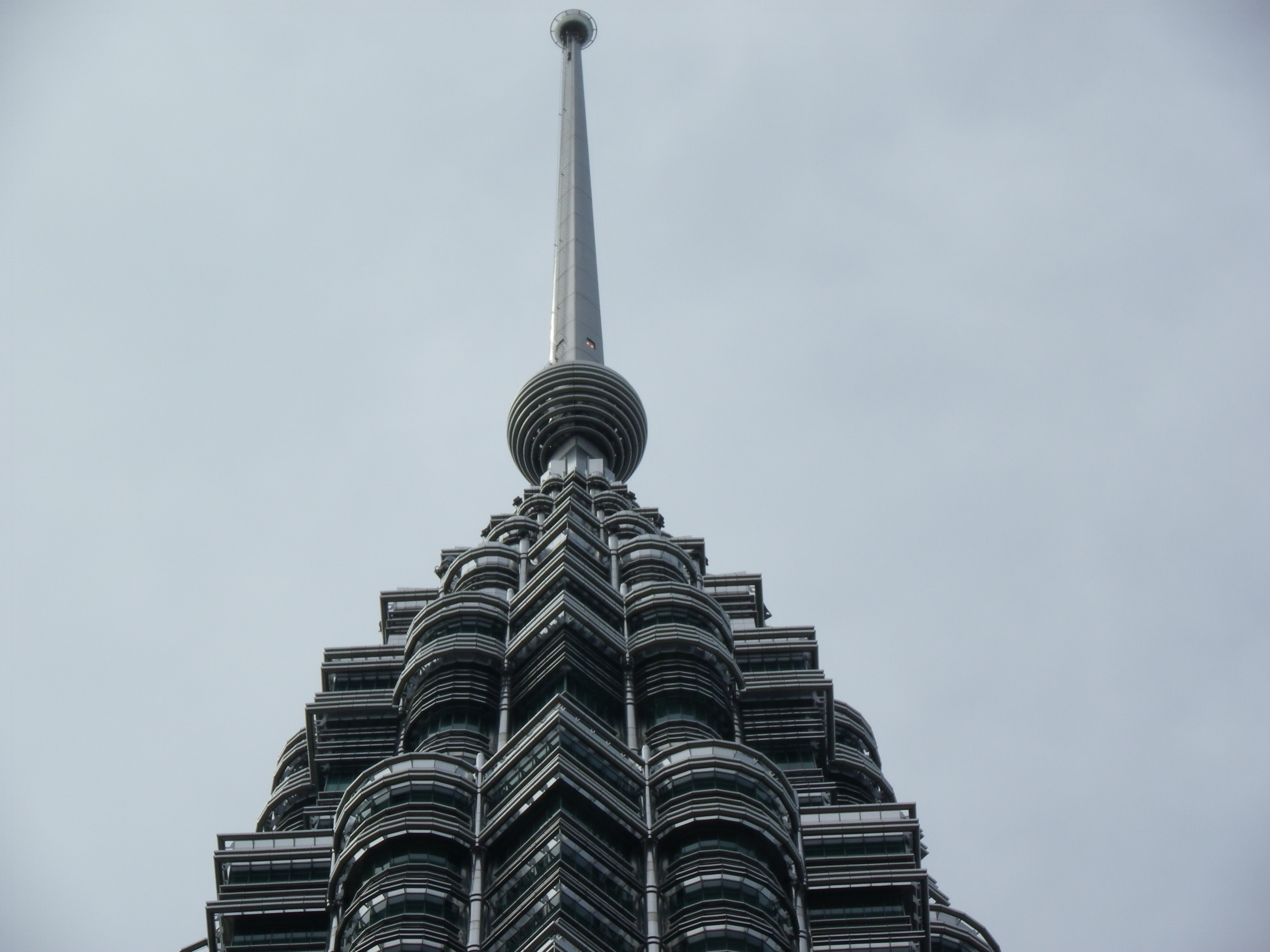
One of the Petronas Towers' spires

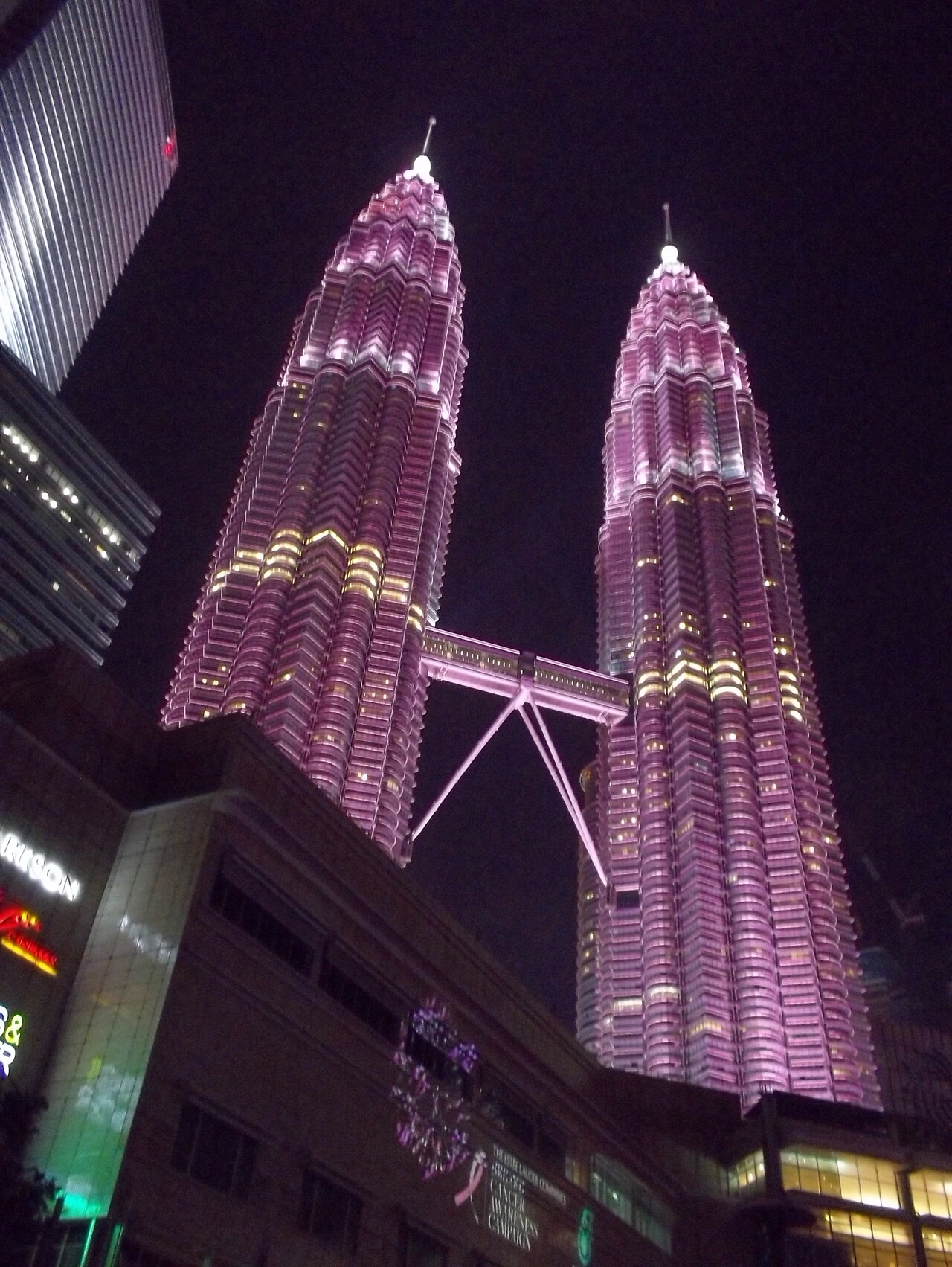
The Petronas Towers lit in pink for breast cancer awareness in 2014

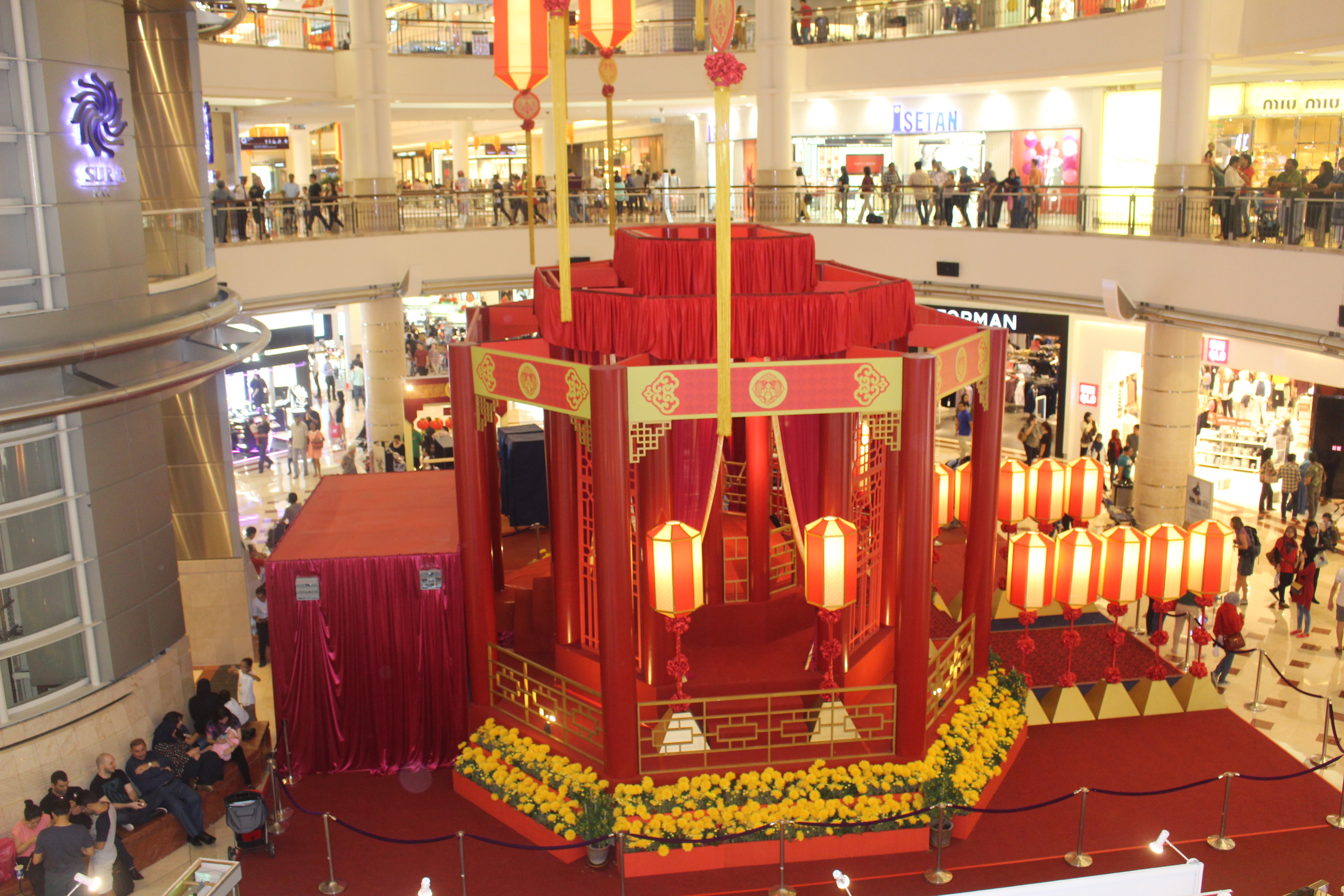
Inside view of Festival Time at Petronas Twin Towers

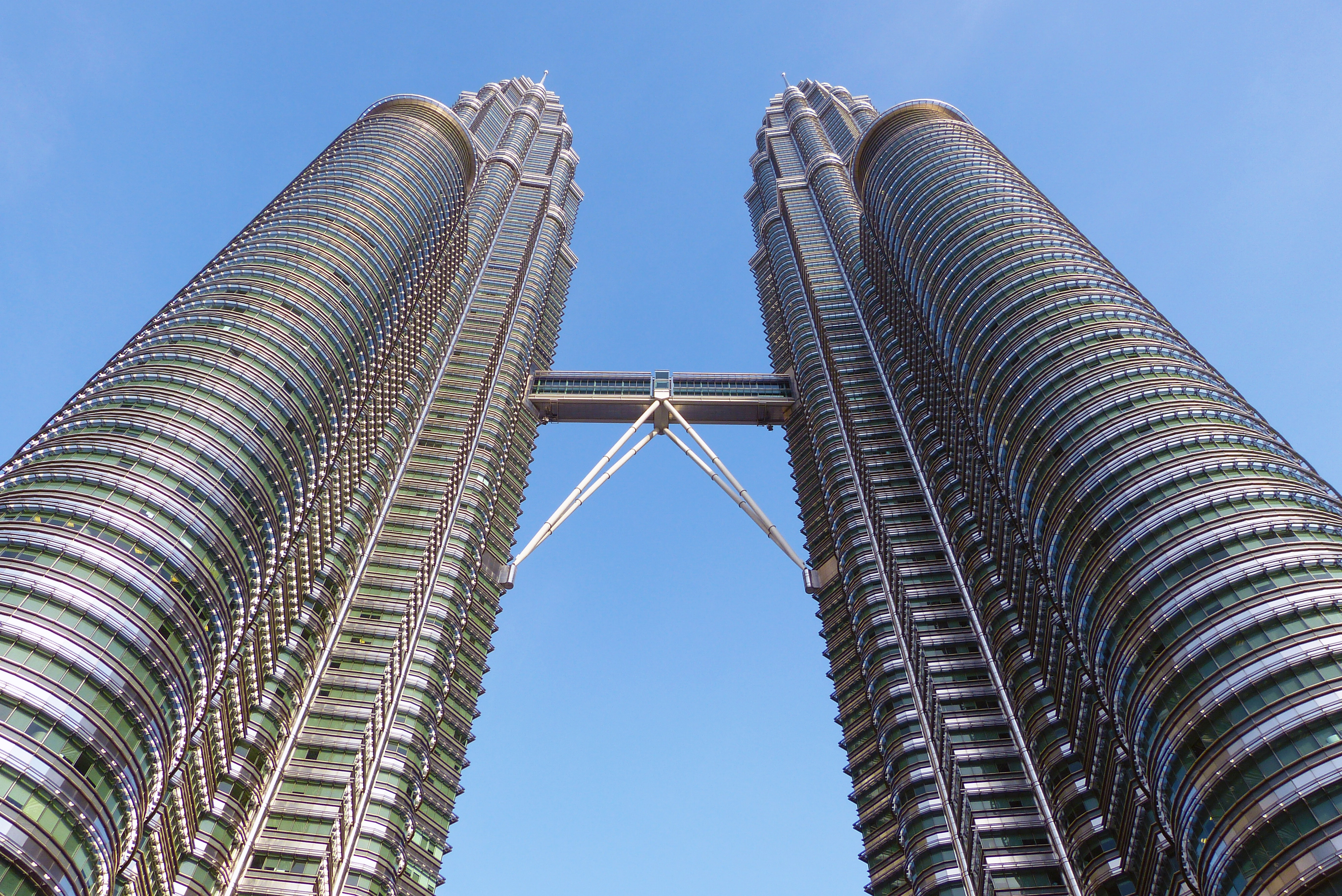
The Petronas Towers from their bases

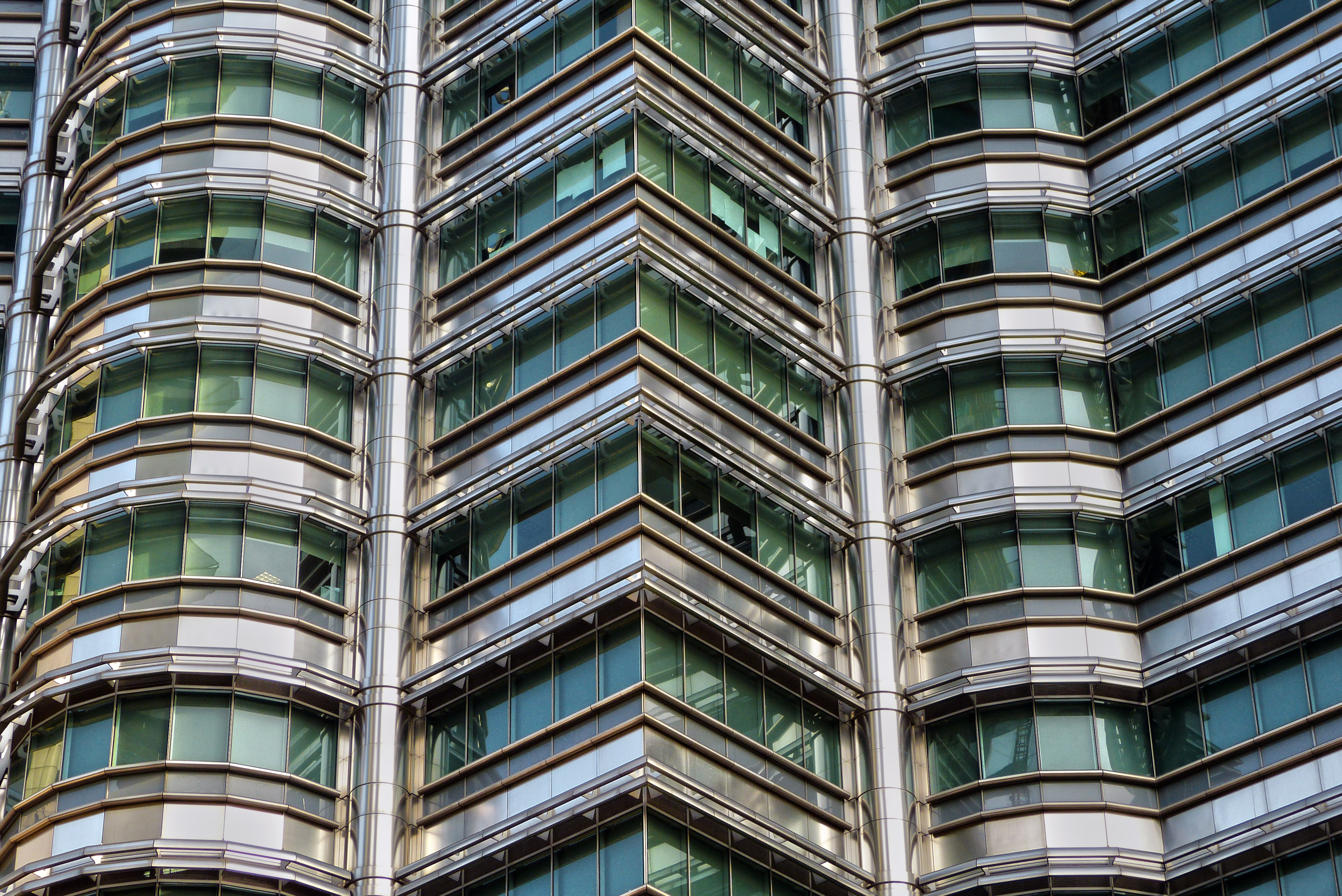
Detailed view from one of the towers

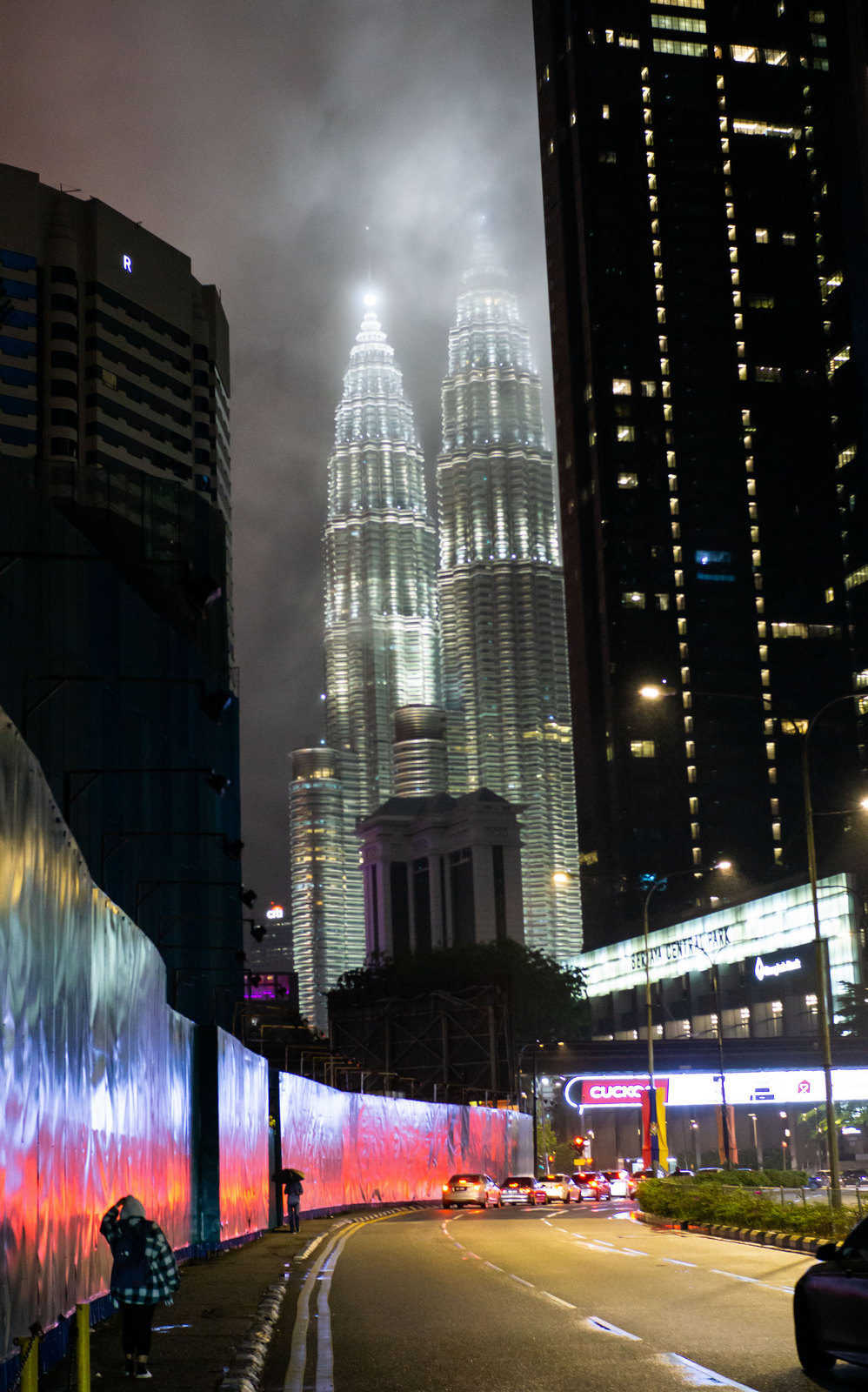
The Petronas Towers illuminated at night, with clouds briefly surrounding the towers

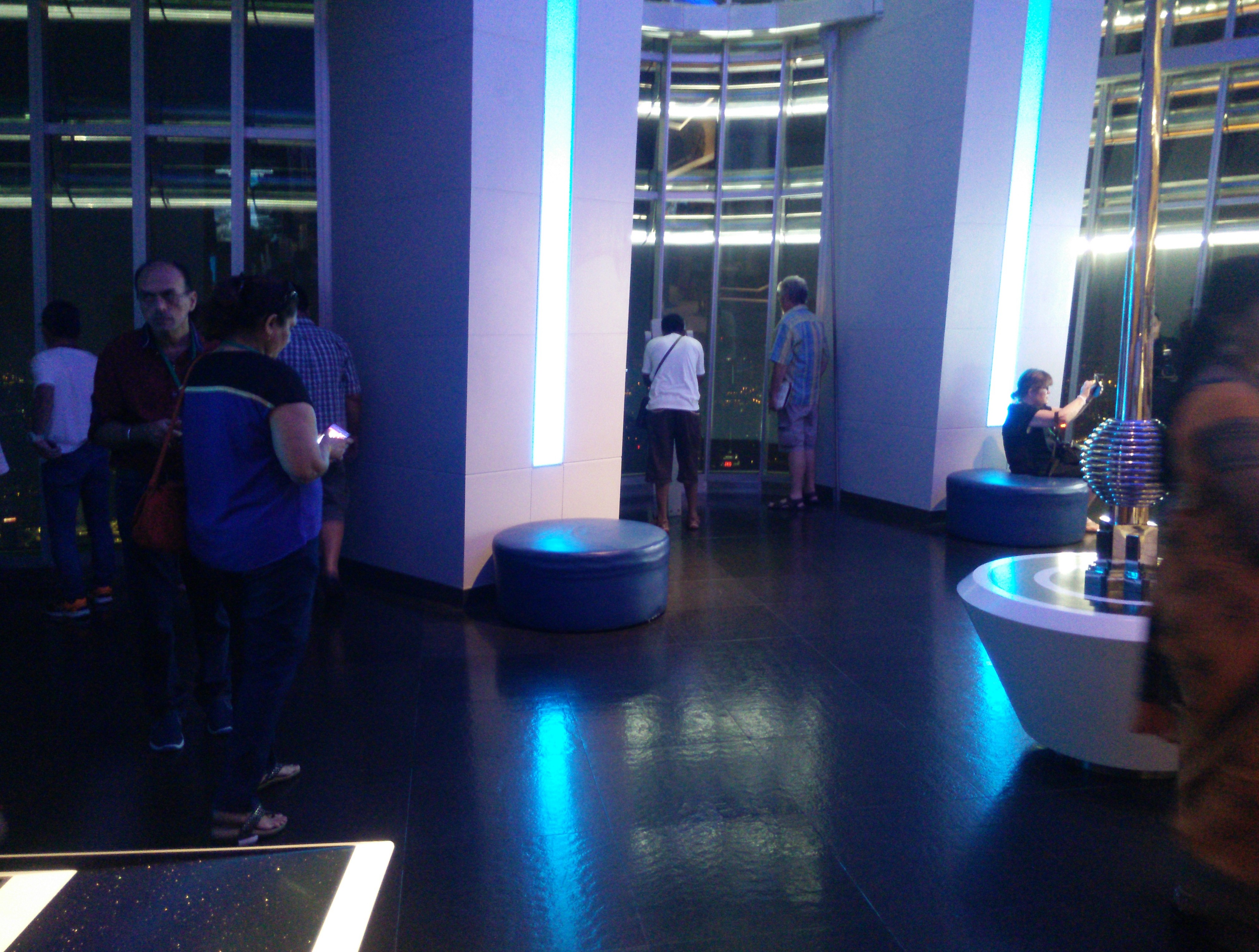
Inside the Petronas Tower 2's observation deck at level 86

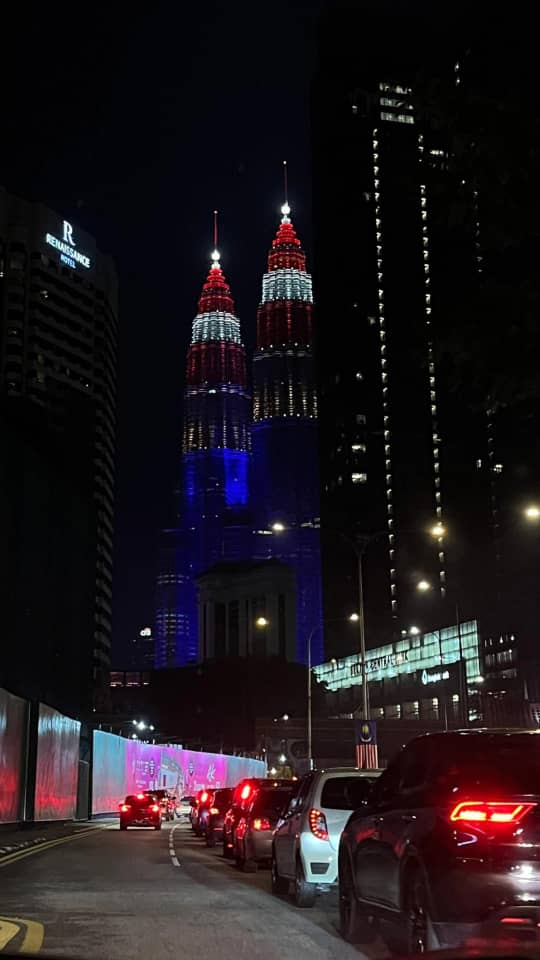
The Petronas Towers illuminated with the colours of the Malaysian flag in Independence day

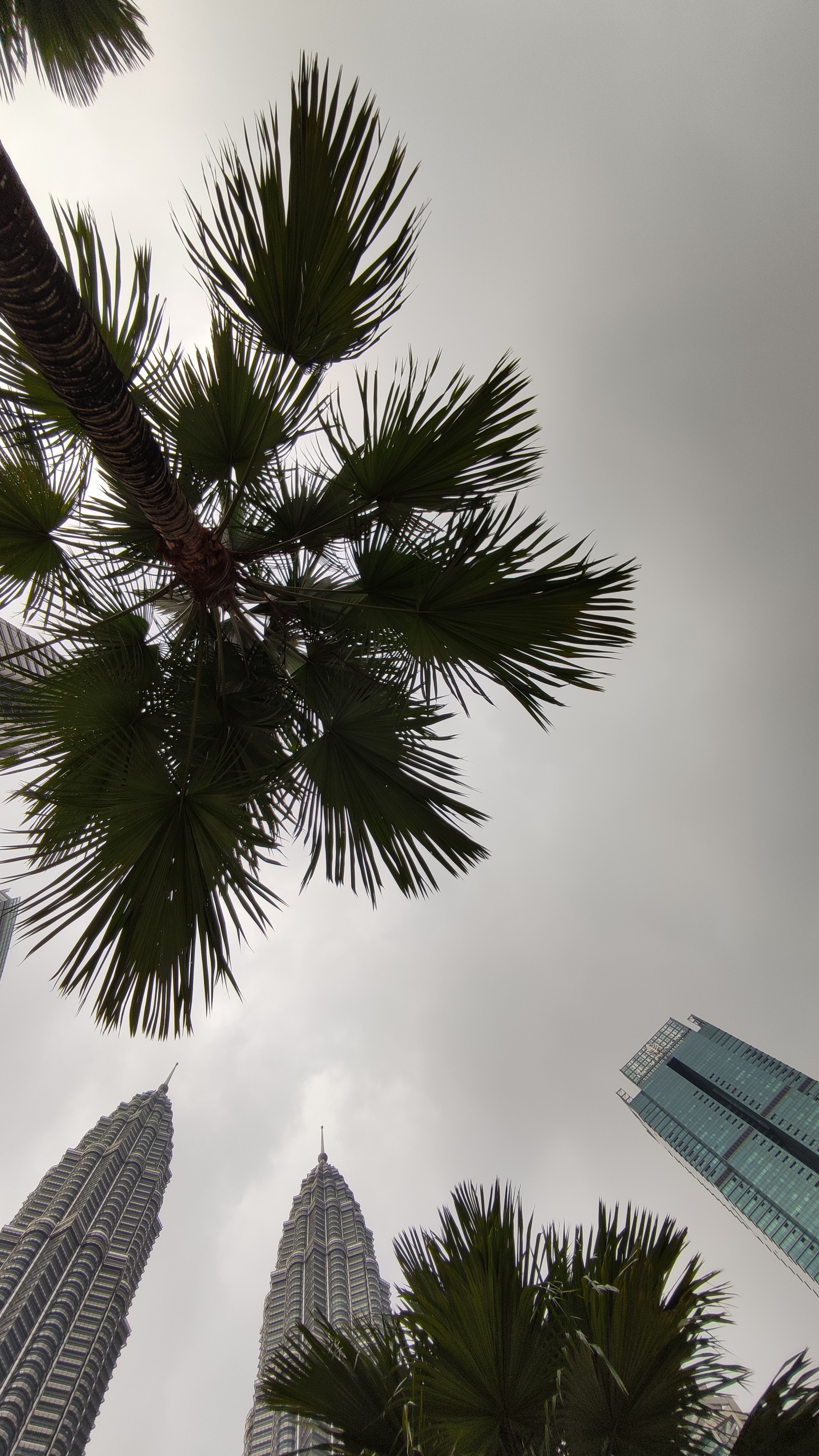
Portrait of Petronas Twin Towers skyline and palm tree shadows

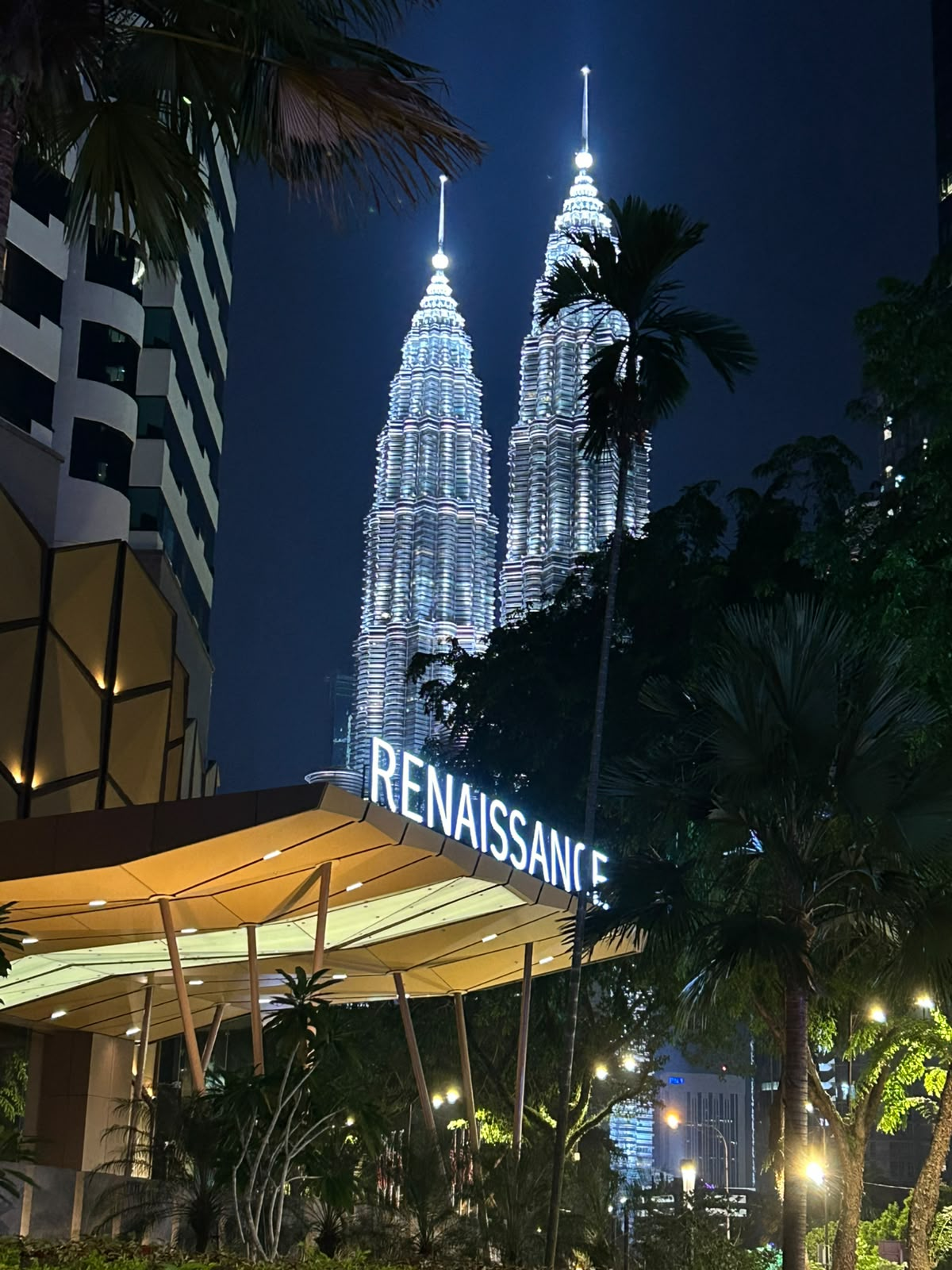
View of the Petronas Towers in the distance at night

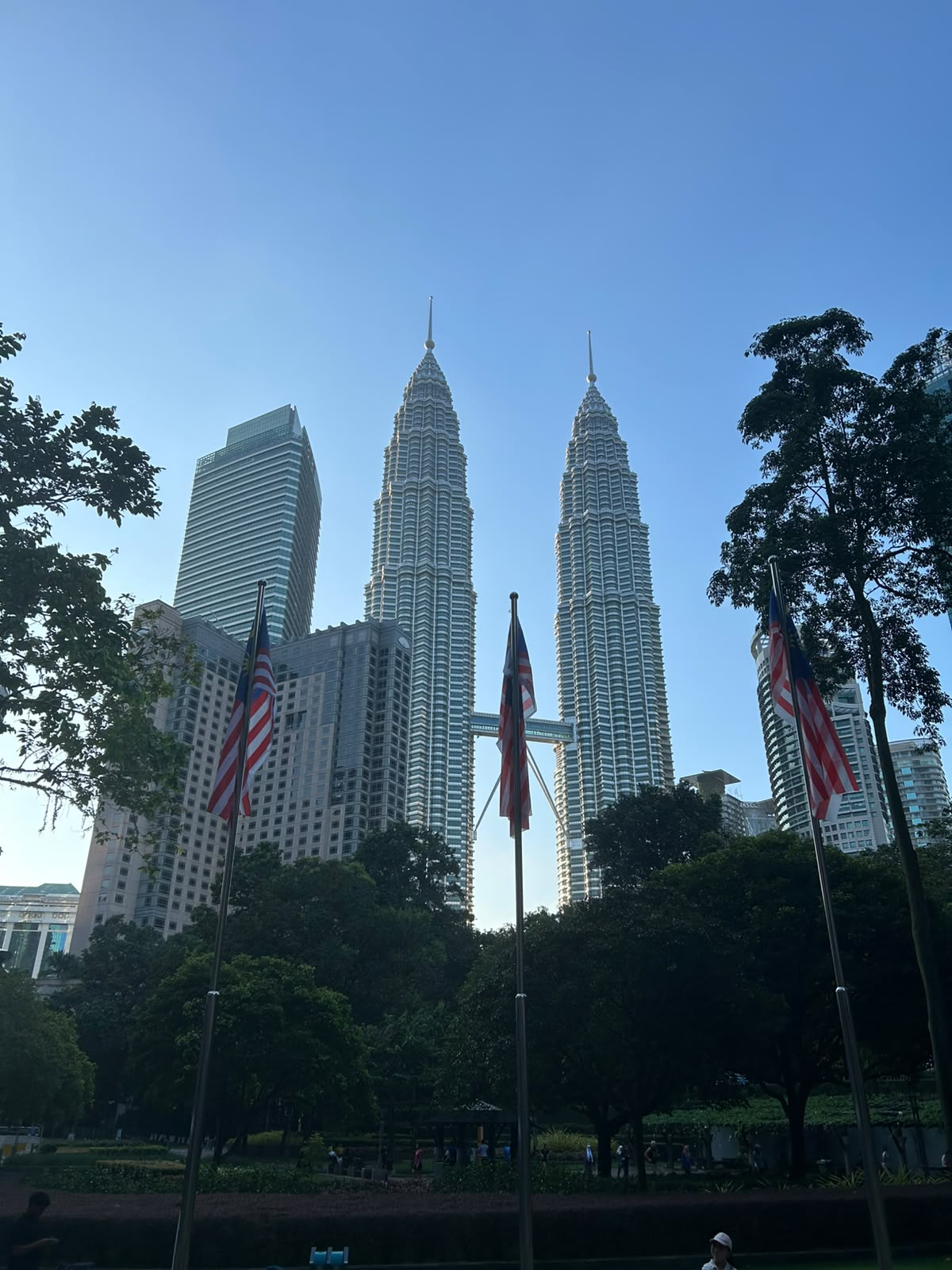
Viewing up towards the Petronas Towers from a park at the KL Convention Centre

== See also ==
- Petronas Tower 3
- The Exchange 106
- List of skyscrapers
- List of tallest buildings and structures in the world
- List of tallest buildings in Kuala Lumpur
- List of tallest buildings in Malaysia
- List of tallest freestanding structures in the world
- List of tallest twin buildings and structures
- Menara Telekom
- Merdeka 118
- Skyscraper Index
- Vanity height

== Notes ==
Records
Preceded by Willis Tower	World's tallest building architectural element 452.0 m (1,482.9 ft); 1998–2003	Succeeded by Taipei 101
Preceded by World Trade Center	World's tallest twin towers 452.0 m (1,482.9 ft); March 11, 1996–present	Succeeded by Incumbent
