= Skyscraper Index =

Idea that the construction of skyscrapers predicts an economic crash

The Skyscraper Index is a concept put forward by Andrew Lawrence, a property analyst at Dresdner Kleinwort Wasserstein, in January 1999, which showed that the world's tallest buildings have risen on the eve of economic downturns. Business cycles and skyscraper construction correlate in such a way that investment in skyscrapers peaks when cyclical growth is exhausted and the economy is ready for recession. Mark Thornton's Skyscraper Index Model successfully predicted the Great Recession at the beginning of August 2007.

The buildings may actually be completed after the onset of the recession or later, when another business cycle pulls the economy up, or even cancelled. Unlike earlier instances of similar reasoning ("height is a barometer of boom"), Lawrence used skyscraper projects as a predictor of economic crisis, not boom.

One statistical study found that the height of buildings is not an accurate predictor of recessions or other aspects of the business cycle, but that GDP can predict the height of building construction.

== Details ==
Lawrence started his paper, The Skyscraper Index: Faulty Towers, as a joke (emphasized by a title referencing a comedy show) and based his index on a comparison of historical data, primarily from the United States' experience. He dismissed overall construction and investment statistics, focusing only on record-breaking projects. The first notable example was the Panic of 1907. Two record-breaking skyscrapers, the Singer Building and the Metropolitan Life Insurance Company Tower, were launched in New York before the panic and completed in 1908 and 1909, respectively. Met Life remained the world's tallest building until 1913. Another string of really tall towers – 40 Wall Street, the Chrysler Building, the Empire State Building – was launched shortly before the Wall Street crash of 1929.

The next record holders, the World Trade Center towers and the Sears Tower, opened in 1973, during the 1973–1974 stock market crash and the 1973 oil crisis. The last example available to Lawrence, the Petronas Twin Towers, opened in the wake of the 1997 Asian financial crisis and held the world height record for five years. Lawrence linked the phenomenon to overinvestment, speculation, and monetary expansion but did not elaborate on these underlying issues. The concept was revived in 2005, when Fortune warily observed five media corporations investing in new skyscrapers in Manhattan (none of them, including the tallest, the New York Times Building, broke any records).

The intuitively simple concept, publicized by the business press in 1999, has been cross-checked within the framework of the Austrian Business Cycle Theory, itself borrowing on Richard Cantillon's eighteenth-century theories. Mark Thornton (2005) listed three Cantillon effects that make the skyscraper index valid. First, a decline in interest rates at the onset of a boom drives land prices. Second, a decline in interest rates allows the average size of a firm to increase, creating demand for larger office spaces. Third, low interest rates provide investment in construction technologies that enable developers to break earlier records. All three factors peak at the end of the growth period.

Critics dismissed the skyscraper index as an unreliable tool: the post-World War I recession, the recession of 1937, and the early 1980s recession were not marked by any record-breaking projects. Construction of the Woolworth Building (world height record 1913–1930) was marked by a local overbuilding crisis in New York City in 1913–1915 concurrent with a record construction boom in Chicago. Thornton argues that completion of the Woolworth Building was followed by a third-worst-ever quarterly decline in gross domestic product, thus it should not be considered an exception from the rule (as Lawrence himself did).

Cyclical patterns in real estate have been thoroughly studied before Lawrence, notably by Homer Hoyt in the 1930s. A 1995 analysis of New York and Chicago's experience by Carol Willis estimated that historically, two-thirds to three-quarters of skyscrapers were conceived for rent alone; corporate "edifices" imposing their owners' brand name (including most historical record-holders) were a minority, and they too leased space to tenants. Speculative real estate markets cycle between the two different behavior patterns.

In normal times when the value of resources is predictable, performance of a building project can be estimated reliably through well-tested formulae. In boom times, rational pricing gives way to irrational buyers' behavior; buyers bet on ever-increasing demand and rents and are willing to pay more than they would normally. Willis said that "height is a barometer of boom", "the tallest buildings generally appear before the end of a boom, their height driven up by the speculative fever that affects both developers and lenders", citing cyclically inflated land values as the principal factor for increases in building height, but did not elevate this fact to become an "index".

A related concept, Skyscraper Indicator, was popularized by Ralph Nelson Elliott in the 1930s.

In some ways this appears to be an elaboration of C. Northcote Parkinson's theory that only organizations in decline have sleek, well-planned buildings. His favorite example was not a skyscraper, but the city of New Delhi (particularly the area now referred to as Lutyen's Delhi) – built shortly before India became independent of the British builders.

The construction of the Burj Khalifa may follow this pattern. In October 2009, the construction company Emaar announced that it had completed the exterior of the building; within two months, the Dubai government came close to defaulting on its loans. Stephen Bayley from The Daily Telegraph commented, "For all the ambition of its construction, Dubai's new Khalifa Tower is a frightening, purposeless monument to the subprime era".

== Empirical test of the hypothesis ==
A study by Barr, Mizrach and Mundra (2015) aims to see if there is, in fact, a correlation between skyscraper height and economic growth. The study looks at two types of data. First, the paper looks at the announcement and completion dates of the world's tallest buildings and the peaks and troughs of the United States business cycle, as measured by the National Bureau of Economic Research. They find that there is virtually no relationship between the timing of record-breaking buildings and the business cycle. Second, the authors investigate height and economic growth using the time series techniques of vector autoregression and cointegration tests. They investigate the time series relationship between the tallest building completed each year and the level of per capita GDP for the United States, Canada, China, and Hong Kong. The authors find that the two series are co-integrated, which means that they move together over time. That is to say, the tallest building completed each year in these countries does not systematically move away from the underlying income of the country, which provides evidence that, in general, skyscraper height is not fundamentally based on height competition among builders. Finally, the vector autoregression methods allow the authors to see if skyscraper height can predict changes in gross domestic product (GDP) (i.e., if heights predict recessions). The authors find that height cannot, in fact, be used to predict changes in GDP. However, GDP can be used to predict changes in height. In other words, the study finds that extreme height is driven by rapid economic growth, but that height cannot be used as an indicator of recessions.

== See also ==
- History of the world's tallest buildings
- List of cities with the most skyscrapers
- List of tallest buildings
- List of tallest buildings and structures
- List of tallest buildings in Europe
- List of tallest buildings in Scandinavia
- List of tallest freestanding structures
- Skyscraper – Tall habitable building
