= KLCC =

KLCC may refer to:

- Kuala Lumpur City Centre or KLCC, a development precinct in Kuala Lumpur
  - KLCC Park
  - Suria KLCC, the shopping mall at the base of the Petronas Twin Towers
  - Kuala Lumpur Convention Centre
  - Aquaria KLCC, a public aquarium
  - Lot C, KLCC, a proposed office tower and retail space extension to Suria KLCC
  - Lot D1, KLCC, an undeveloped land, which currently serves as a car park lot, in front of Mandarin Oriental hotel
  - KLCC LRT station, an underground light rapid transit station serving the KLCC area
  - Persiaran KLCC MRT station, an underground under-construction station serving the KLCC area
- KLCC (FM), a radio station (89.7 FM) licensed to Eugene, Oregon, United States
