= Fairmont Kuala Lumpur Towers =

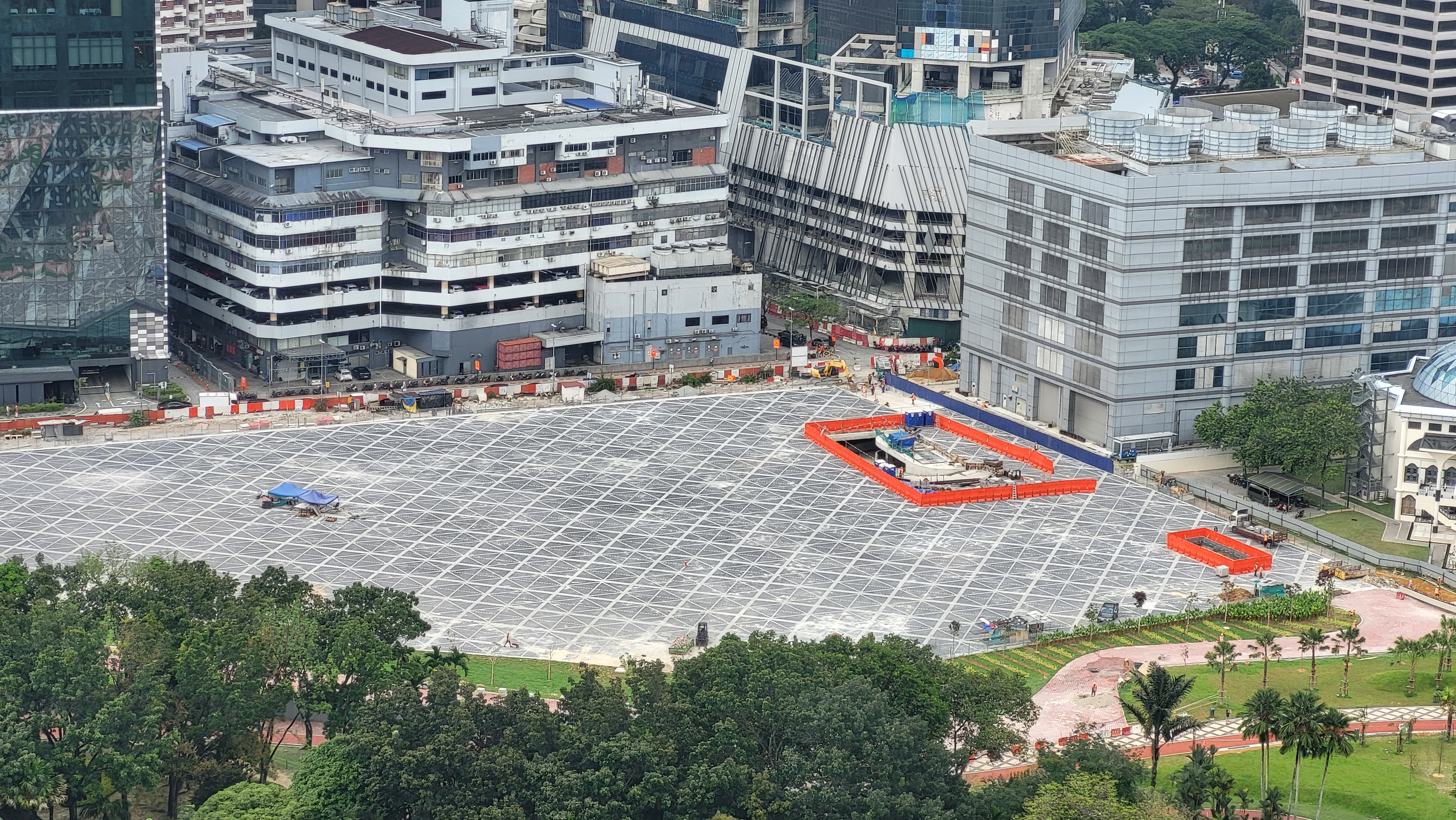
- Construction site in February 2025
- Interactive map of the Fairmont Kuala Lumpur Towers area

General information
- Status: Proposed (on-hold)
- Type: Mixed-use
- Location: Jalan Lumba Kuda, Kuala Lumpur, Malaysia
- Coordinates: 3.158°N 101.712°E
- Construction started: 2014
- Completed: 2028
- Owner: KLCC Property Holdings
- Operator: Fairmont Hotels & Resorts

Height
- Architectural: 370 m (1,214 ft) (Tower 1); 280 m (919 ft) (Tower 2)

Technical details
- Floor count: 78 (Tower 1); 71 (Tower 2)
- Floor area: 150,000 m^{2} (1,600,000 sq ft)

Design and construction
- Architect: XYZ Architects
- Developer: KLCC Holdings & QD Asia Pacific
- Engineer: ABC Engineering

Other information
- Number of rooms: 500
- Number of suites: 100
- Number of restaurants: 5

Website
- Fairmont Kuala Lumpur

Fairmont Kuala Lumpur Towers, also known as Fairmont KL Towers (Fairmont KL Tower 1 and Fairmont KL Tower 2), is a proposed pair of mixed-use twin skyscrapers located in the prestigious Kuala Lumpur City Centre area of Kuala Lumpur, developed by KLCC Property Holdings in collaboration with QD Asia Pacific. Construction commenced in 2014, but significant work was halted in 2018 and did not resume until early 2024. As of early 2025, the basement structure up to the ground level is completed. A temporary plaza called Dataran KLCC has been constructed to serve the area until the primary tower construction continues.

== Gallery ==
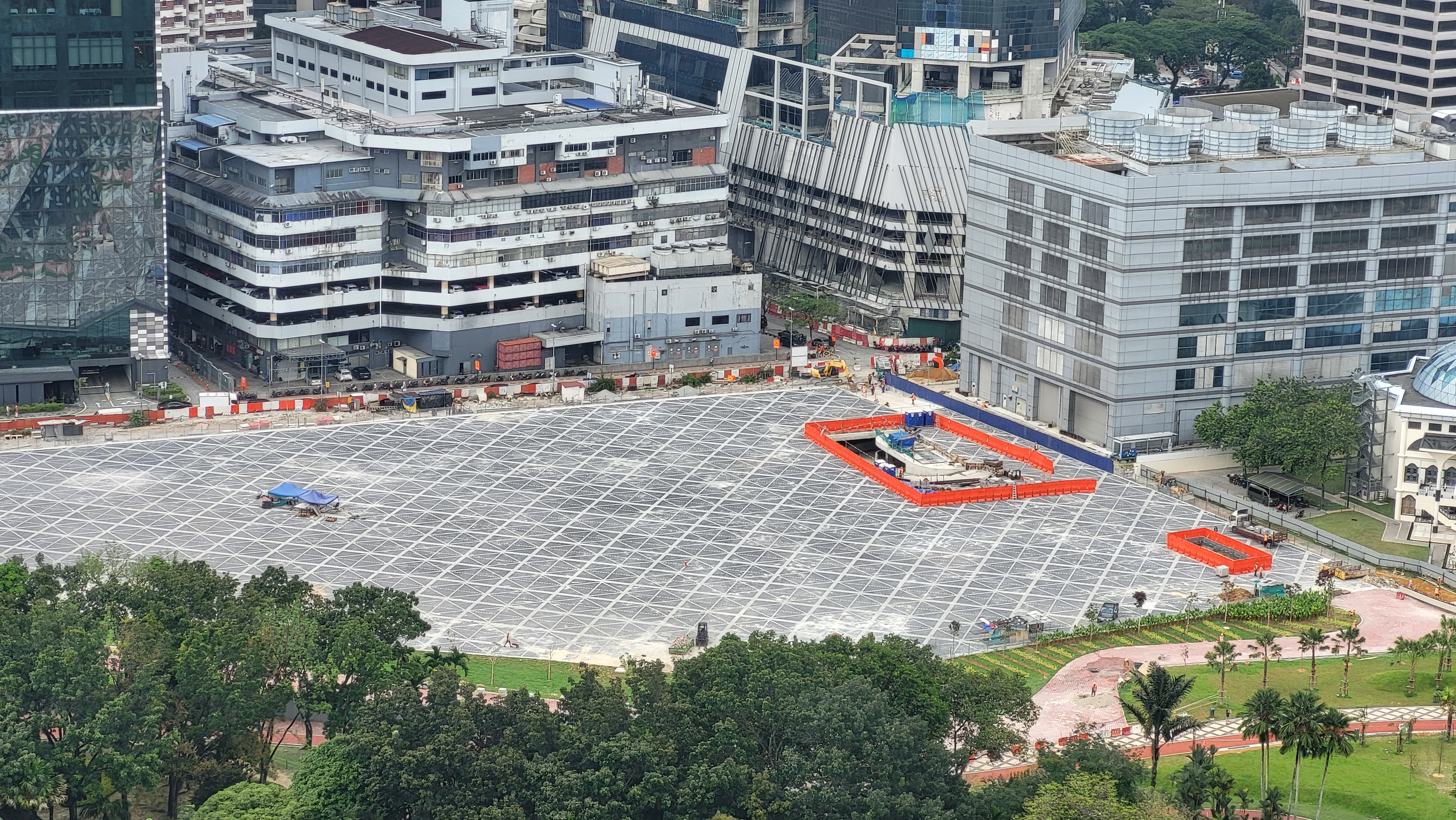
Construction site covered in February 2025. To be used as public square

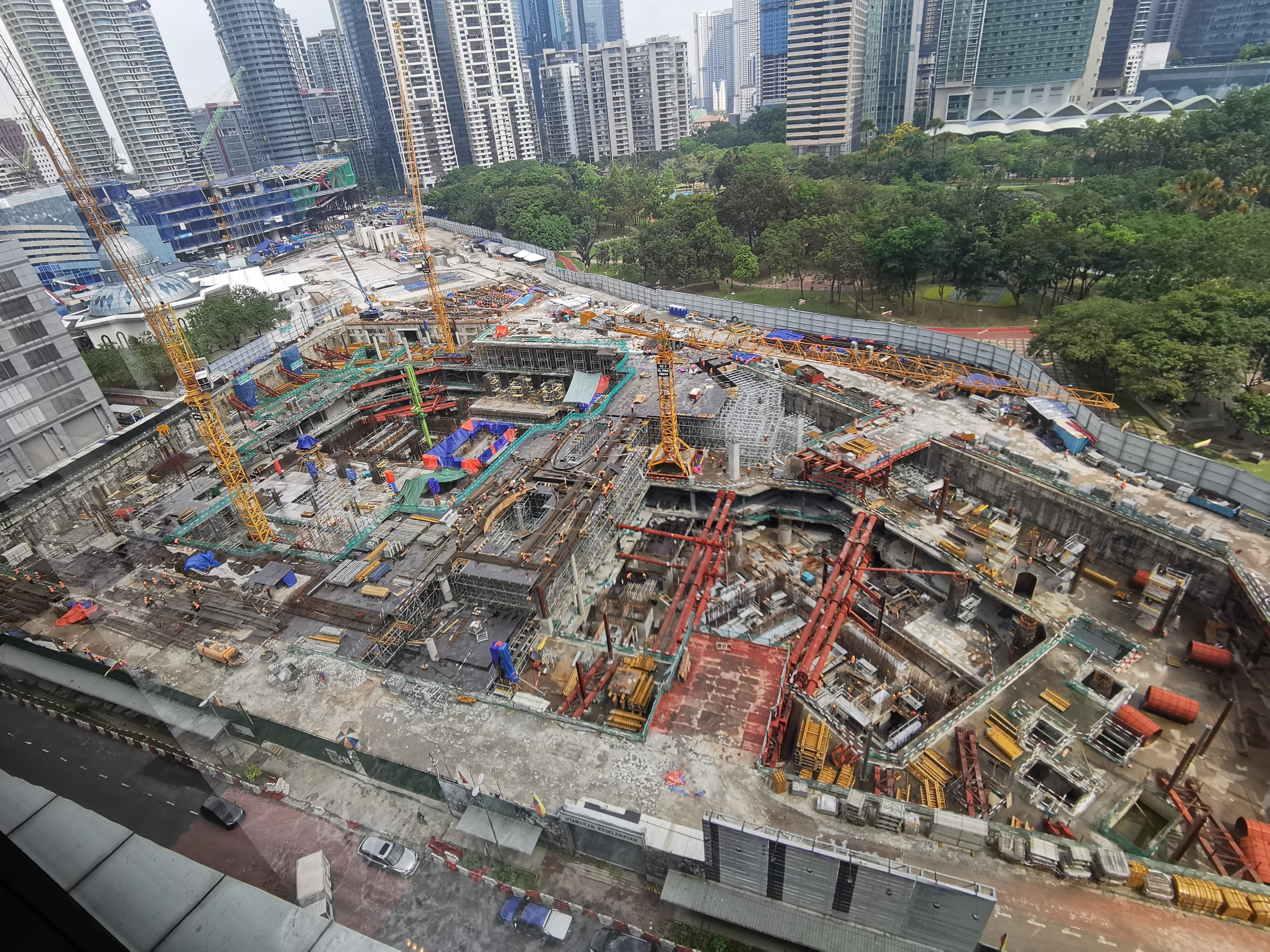
Construction site in April 2024

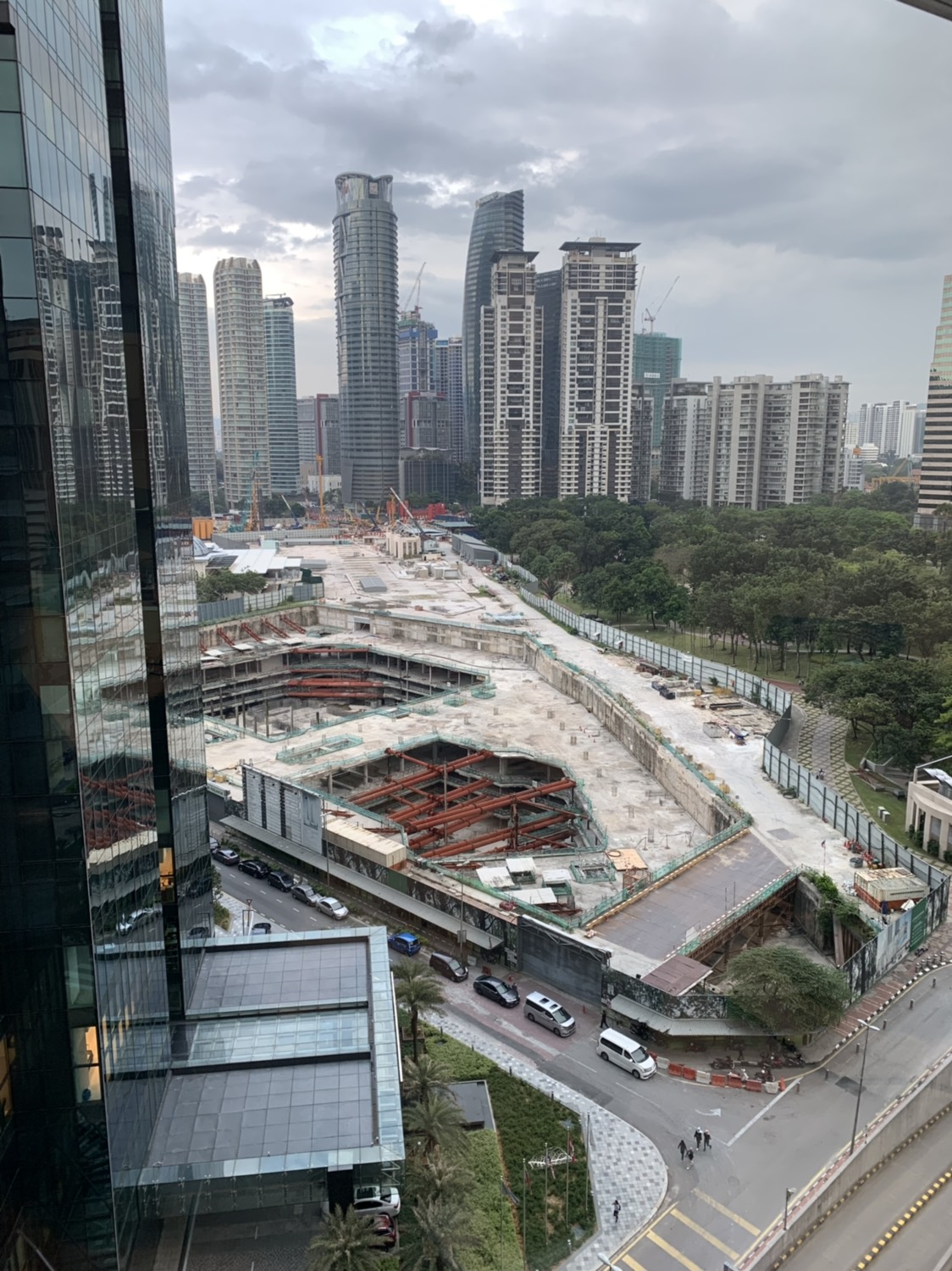
Construction site in January 2019 as seen from Maxis Tower

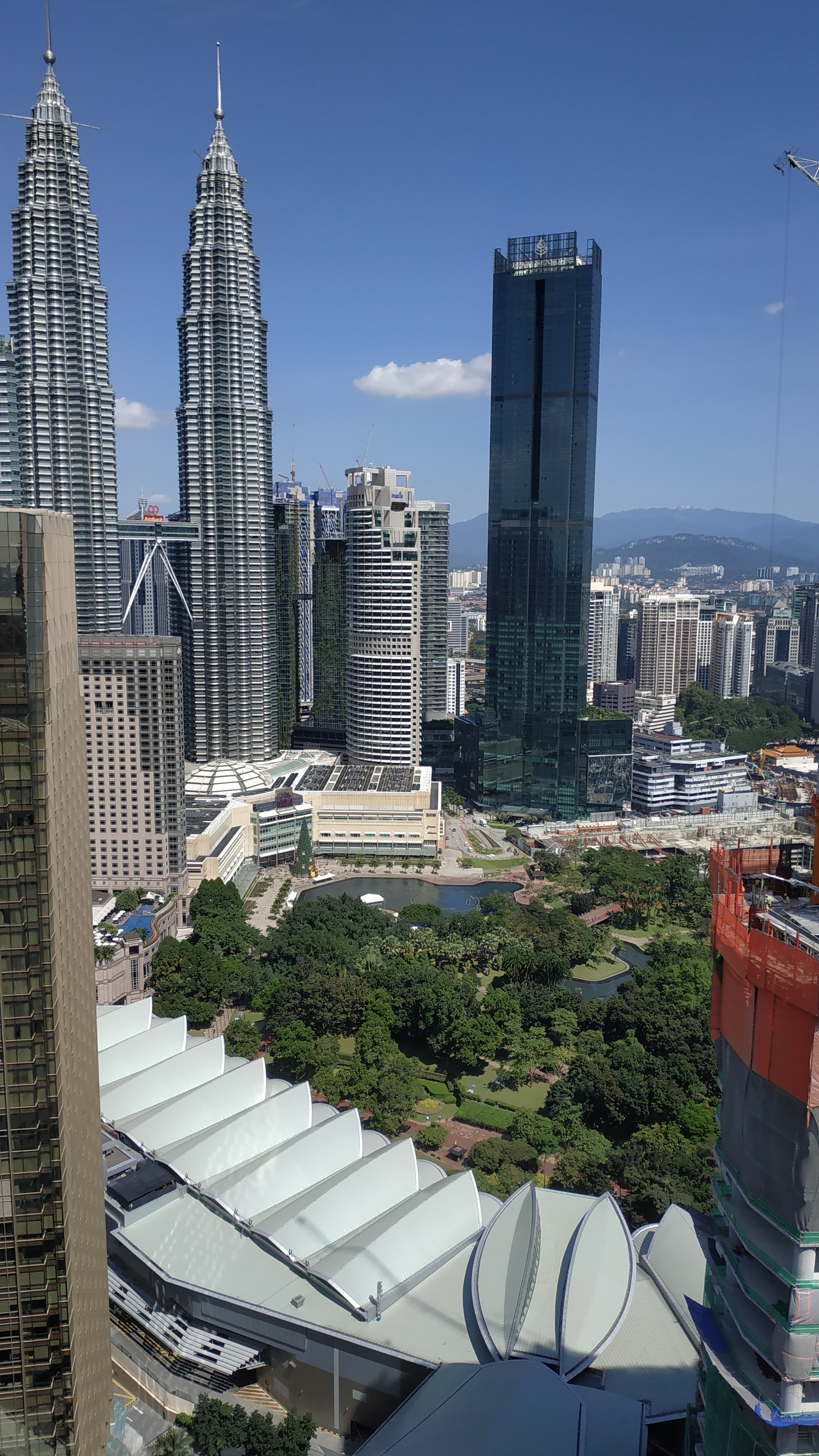
Part of the construction site at the foot of Four Seasons Place (black skyscraper) in December 2018
