= KLCC LRT station =

LRT station in Kuala Lumpur, Malaysia

Coordinates: 3°09′33″N 101°42′50″E

KJ10 KLCC
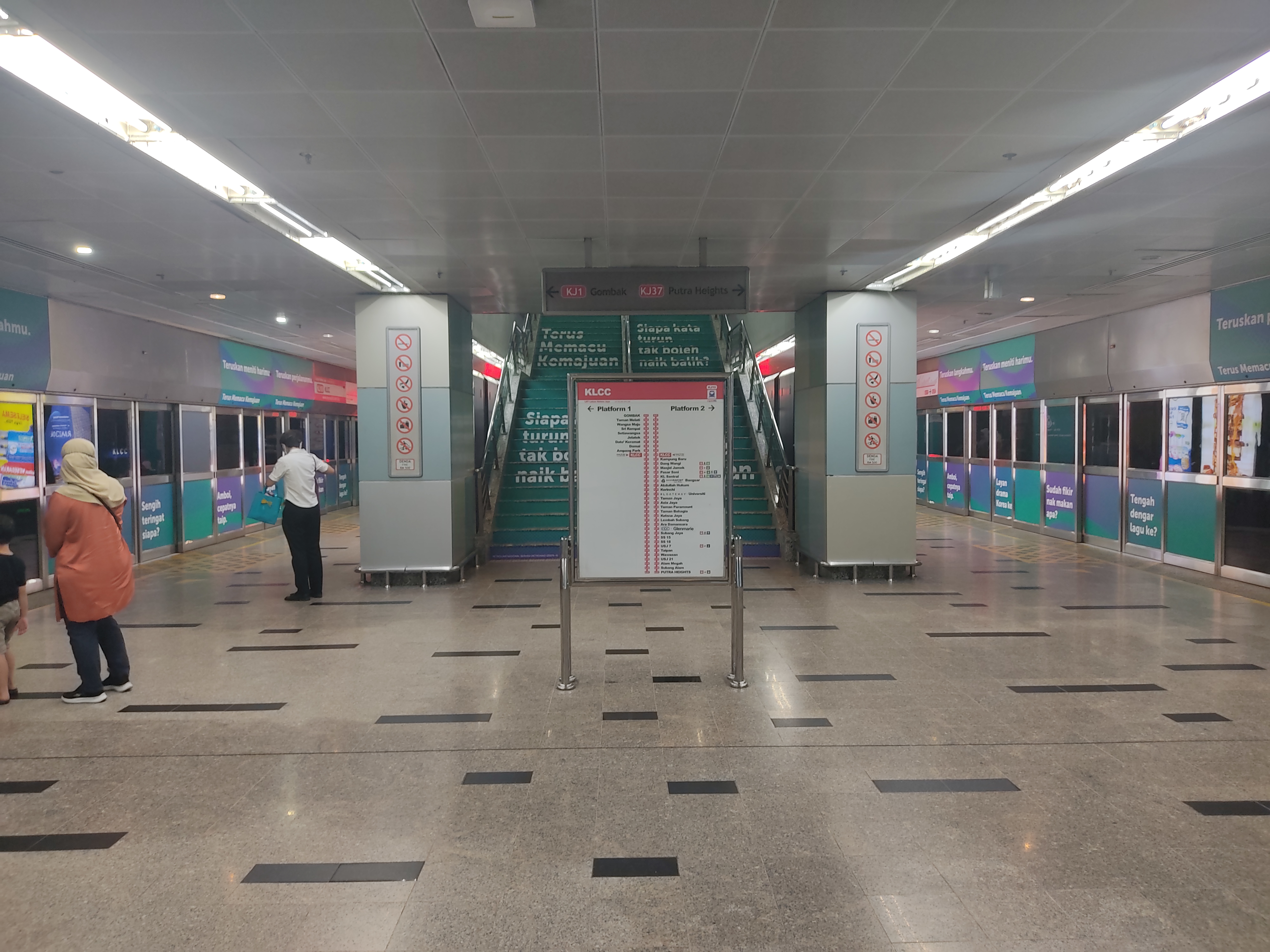
- The underground station platform.

General information
- Other names: Malay: کي.ايل.سي.سي. (Jawi); Chinese: 城中城; Tamil: கேஎல்சிசி
- Location: Jalan Ampang; 50450 Kuala Lumpur; Malaysia
- System: Rapid KL
- Owner: Prasarana Malaysia
- Operator: Rapid Rail
- Line: 5 Kelana Jaya Line
- Platforms: 1 island platform
- Tracks: 2

Construction
- Structure type: Underground
- Parking: Available at Suria KLCC and Avenue K.
- Accessible: Available

Other information
- Station code: KJ10

History
- Opened: 1 June 1999; 27 years ago

Services
Preceding station		Following station
Ampang Park towards Gombak	Kelana Jaya Line	Kampung Baru towards Putra Heights
Location

KLCC LRT station is an underground light rapid transit station in Kuala Lumpur, Malaysia, served by the LRT Kelana Jaya Line.

It is located in the basement of Avenue K, a shopping mall along Jalan Ampang. A pedestrian subway links the station to Suria KLCC and the rest of the Kuala Lumpur City Centre (KLCC) development which includes the Petronas Twin Towers, Maxis Tower and the Kuala Lumpur Convention Centre. Located outside the station, along Jalan Ampang and Jalan P Ramlee, is the KLCC bus hub.

Located right in the middle of the city center, it is close to many landmarks, making it one of the busiest stations in the LRT system. It is packed especially on weekends and school holidays.

The pedestrian walkway linking the Kuala Lumpur Convention Centre (which is linked to Suria KLCC via an underground pedestrian tunnel) and the Pavilion Kuala Lumpur shopping centre in Bukit Bintang was added in January 2012, thus linking this station with the nearby Raja Chulan Monorail station, Bukit Bintang Monorail station and Bukit Bintang MRT station.

== Layout ==
The station consists of three levels, with entrances on the ground level (on the street in front of Suria KLCC and also inside Avenue K), while the ticketing area, concourse, and platforms are underground.

G	Street Level	Jalan Ampang, Avenue K, Suria KLCC, Petronas Twin Towers
C	Concourse	Faregates, Ticketing Machines, Station Control
P	Platform 1:	5 Kelana Jaya Line towards KJ1 Gombak (→)
P	Island platform, Doors will open on the right
P	Platform 2:	5 Kelana Jaya Line towards KJ37 Putra Heights (←)

Other nearby landmarks include:

- AmBank Tower
- Aquaria KLCC
- Avenue K
- ExxonMobil Tower
- KLCC District Cooling plant
- KLCC Park
- Kuala Lumpur Convention Centre
- Maxis Tower
- Persiaran KLCC MRT station (700 m walk)
- Petronas Philharmonic Hall
- Petronas Tower 3
- Petronas Twin Towers
- Public Bank Tower
- Suria KLCC

== Gallery ==
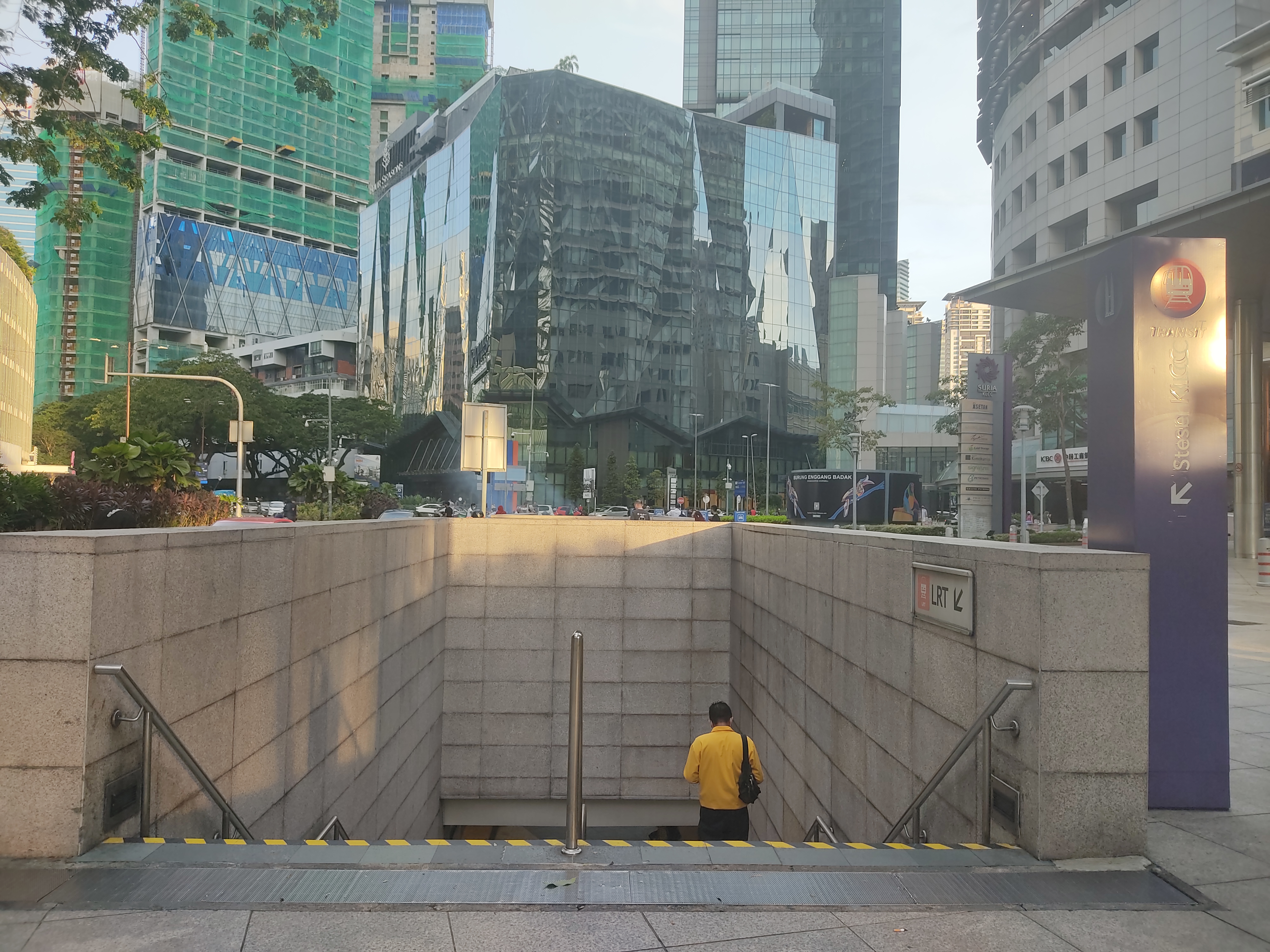
The street level entrance to the station from the entrance of Suria KLCC

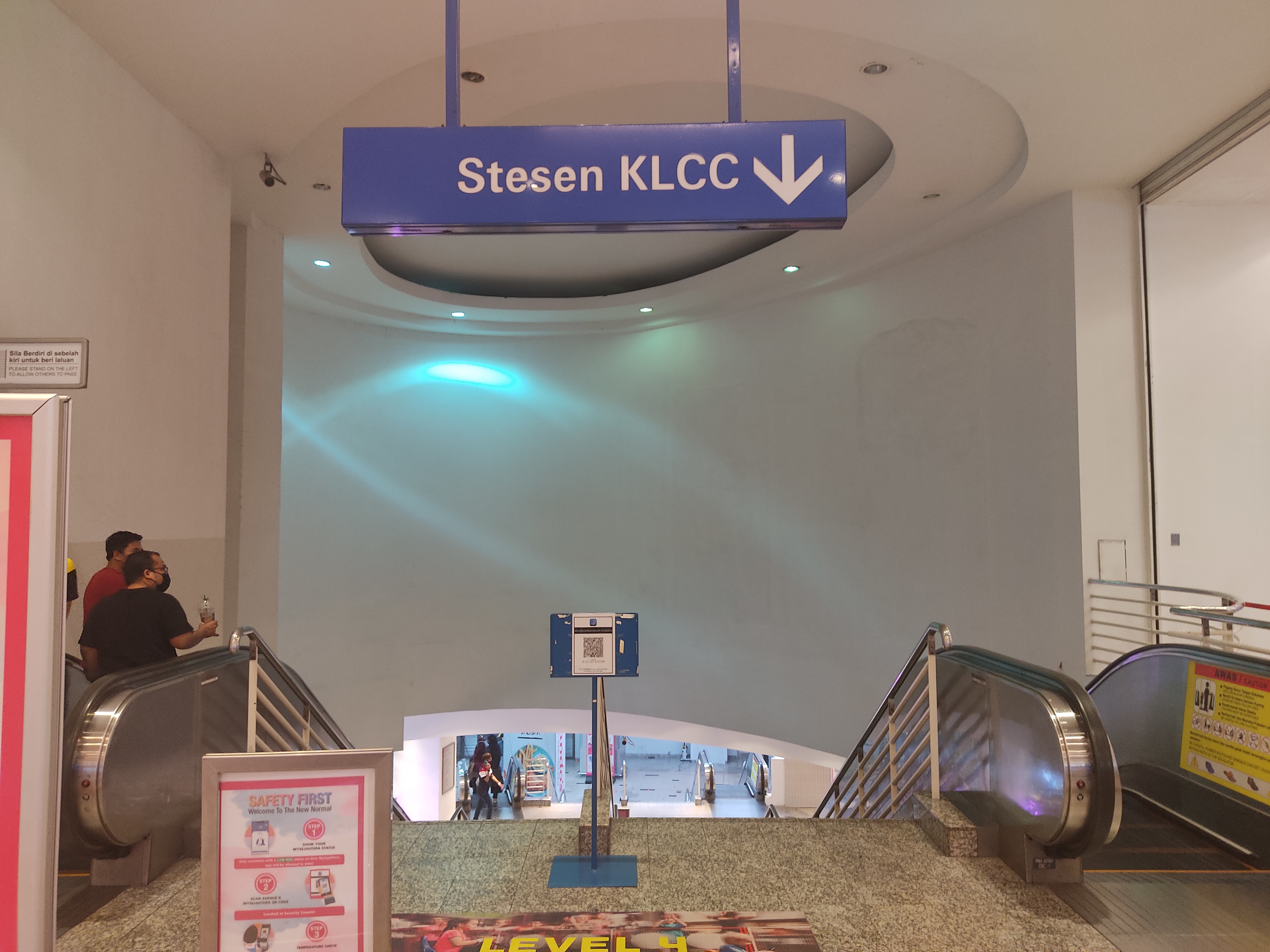
Avenue K ground level entrance to the station

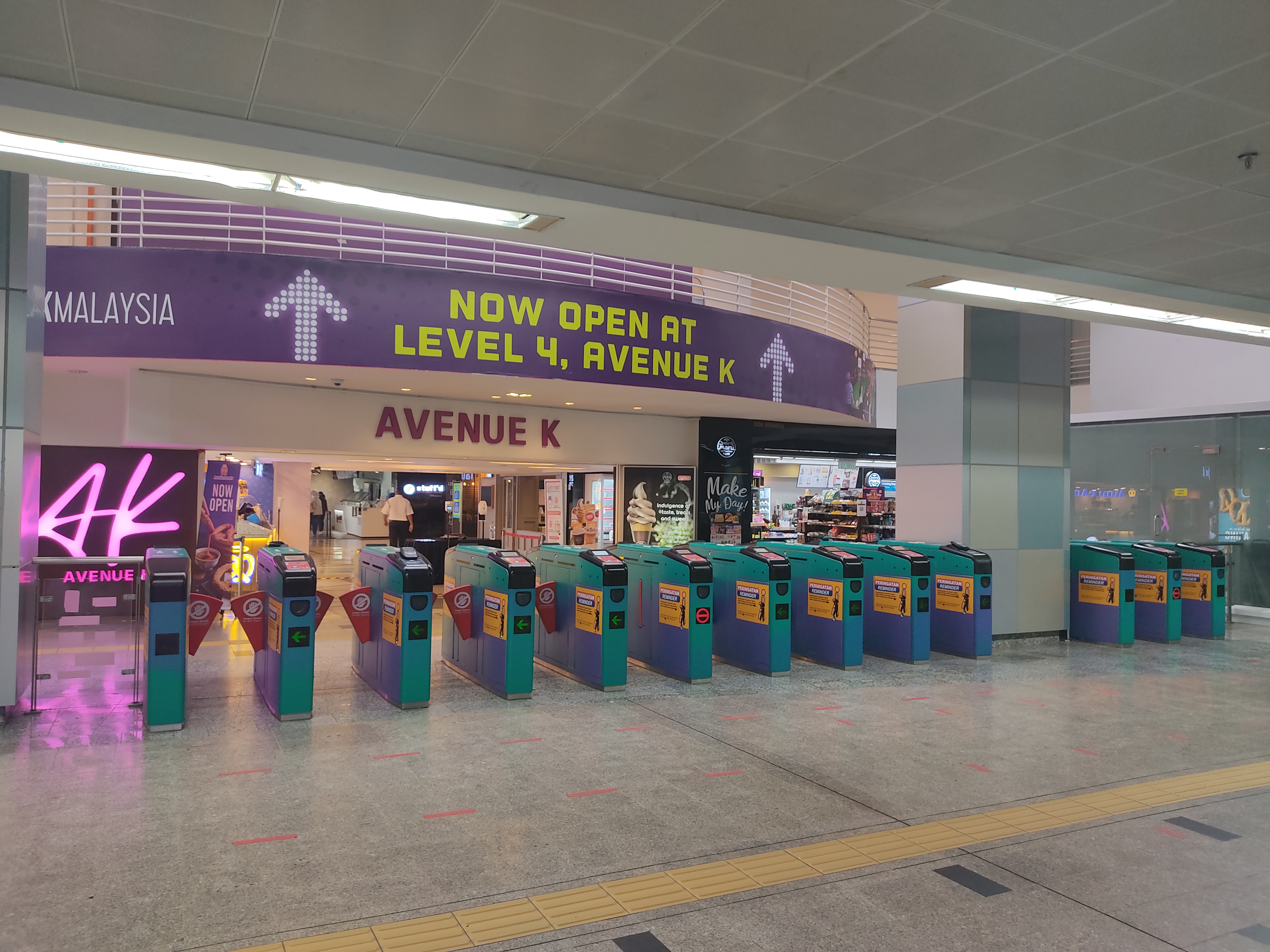
The fare gates to/from the station with the Avenue K shopping mall's concourse beyond

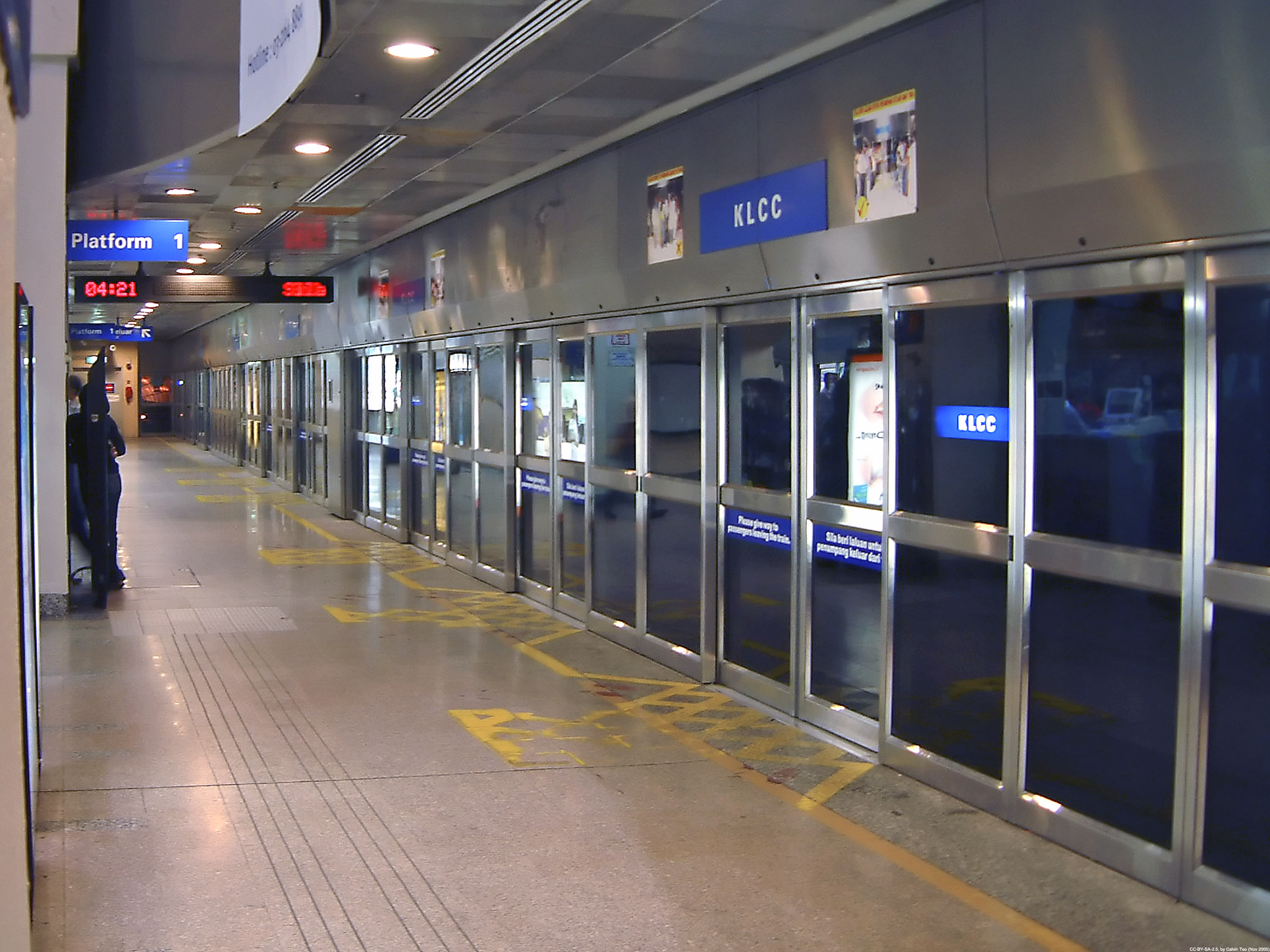
The platform's of the station before refurbishment
