= Petronas Office Tower =

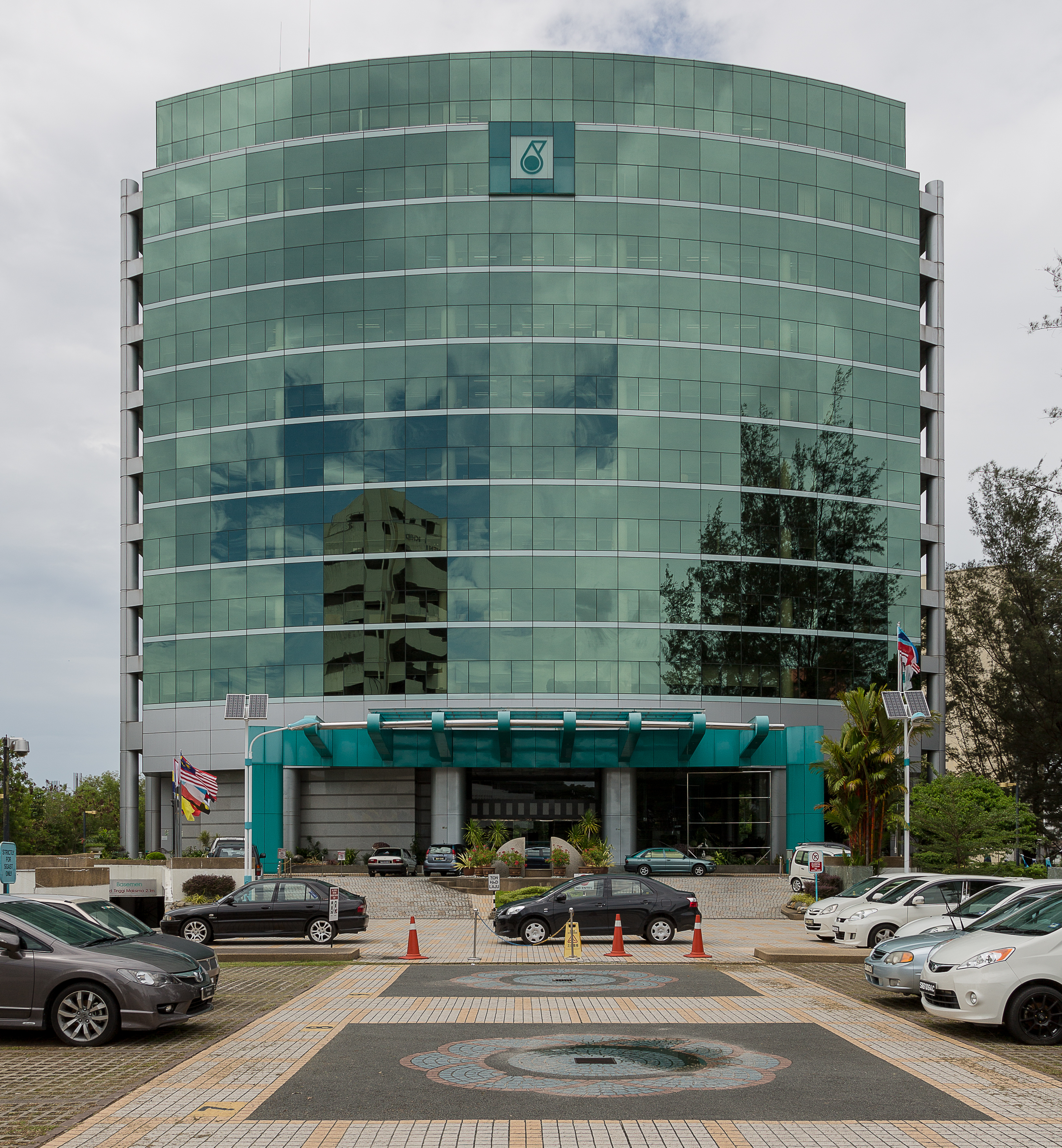
- Petronas Office Tower on 2 September 2013.

General information
- Status: Completed
- Location: Sabah, Kota Kinabalu, Malaysia
- Owner: Petronas; Its prestressed building structure designed and constructed by YTL Corporation Bhd

Petronas Office Tower or Petronas Tower 4 is an office building for Petronas in Kota Kinabalu, Sabah, Malaysia.

The Petronas Office Tower is the fourth Petronas Tower after Petronas Tower 3.

Construction of a second 11-storey tower which will be located beside the building was started in 2016 with a cost of RM136.9 million and is set to be complete in August 2018. Its prestressed building structure designed and constructed by YTL Corporation Bhd
