= Four Seasons Place Kuala Lumpur =

Supertall skyscraper in Kuala Lumpur, Malaysia

Coordinates: 3°09′29″N 101°42′50″E

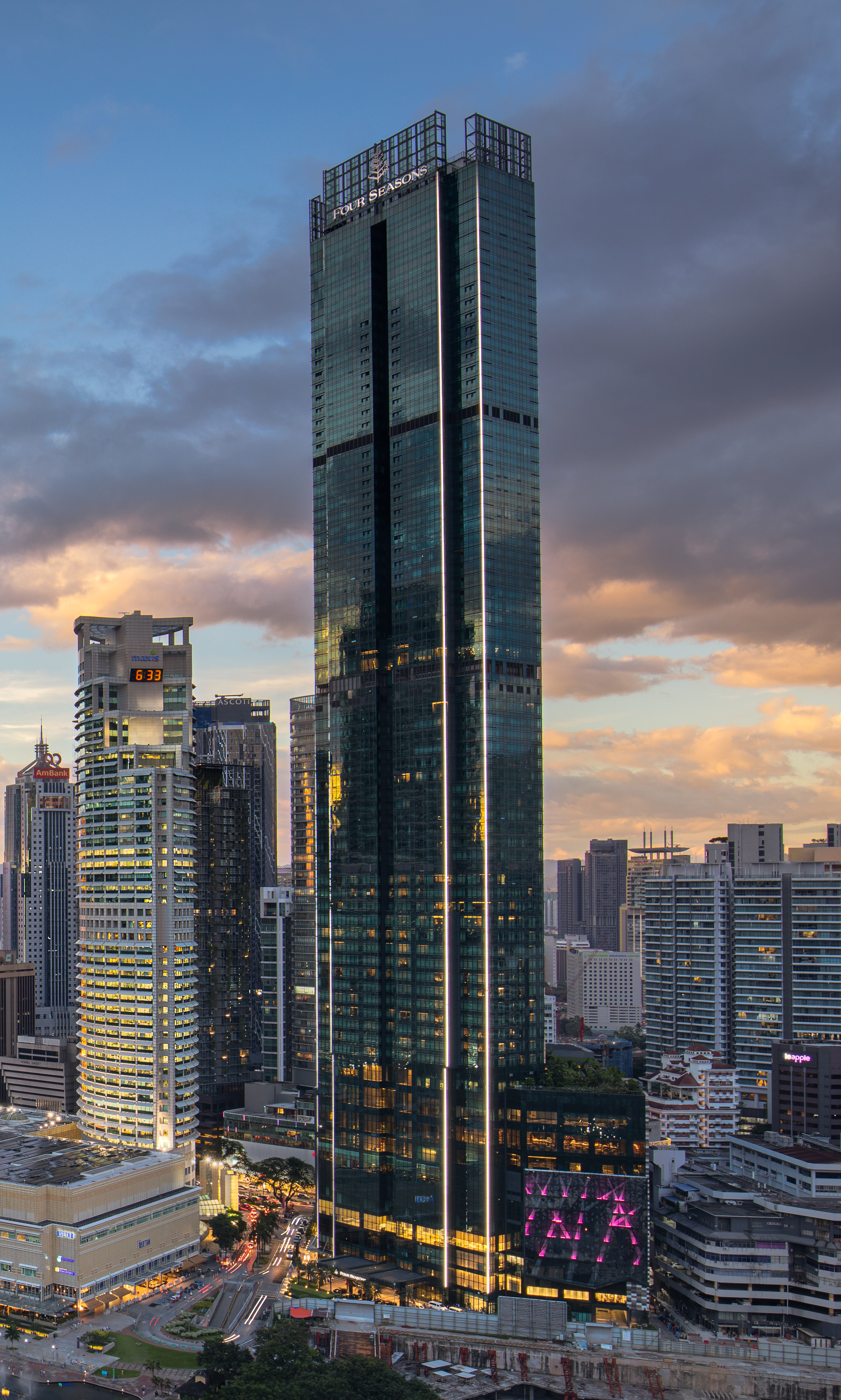
- Four Seasons Place in December 2019 with Maxis Tower at the background
- Interactive map of the Four Seasons Place Kuala Lumpur area
- Alternative names: Four Seasons KL, Four Seasons Hotel Kuala Lumpur, Four Seasons KLCC

General information
- Status: Completed
- Type: Mixed-use
- Location: Kuala Lumpur, Malaysia, 145, Jalan Ampang, Kuala Lumpur City Centre
- Construction started: 2013
- Completed: 2018
- Opening: 18 November 2018
- Owner: Four Seasons Hotels and Resorts
- Operator: Four Seasons Hotels and Resorts

Height
- Architectural: 342.5 m (1,124 ft)
- Tip: 342.5 m (1,124 ft)
- Roof: 342.5 m (1,124 ft)
- Top floor: 319.5 m (1,048 ft)

Technical details
- Floor count: 74 (with 4 below ground)

Design and construction
- Architect: NRY Architects
- Developer: Venus Assets
- Engineer: Meinhardt
- Services engineer: KTA Tenaga

Other information
- Number of rooms: 236
- Number of suites: 242

Website
- www.fourseasons.com/kualalumpur/

Four Seasons Place Kuala Lumpur, also known as Four Seasons KLCC and FSP KLCC Tower, is a 74-story, 342.5-metre-tall (1,124 ft) supertall skyscraper in Kuala Lumpur City Centre, Malaysia. It features a 21 m-high (69 ft) crown made out of steel at the top of the tower, making the tower reach the height of 342.5 m (1,124 ft). It is located within the Kuala Lumpur City Centre precinct in Kuala Lumpur, Malaysia. The building was developed by Ipoh-born Singapore tycoon, Ong Beng Seng, partnering Tan Sri Syed Yusof Tun Syed Nasir and the Sultan of Selangor under Venus Assets Sdn Bhd. It is currently the sixth tallest building in Malaysia.

== Shoppes at Four Seasons Place ==
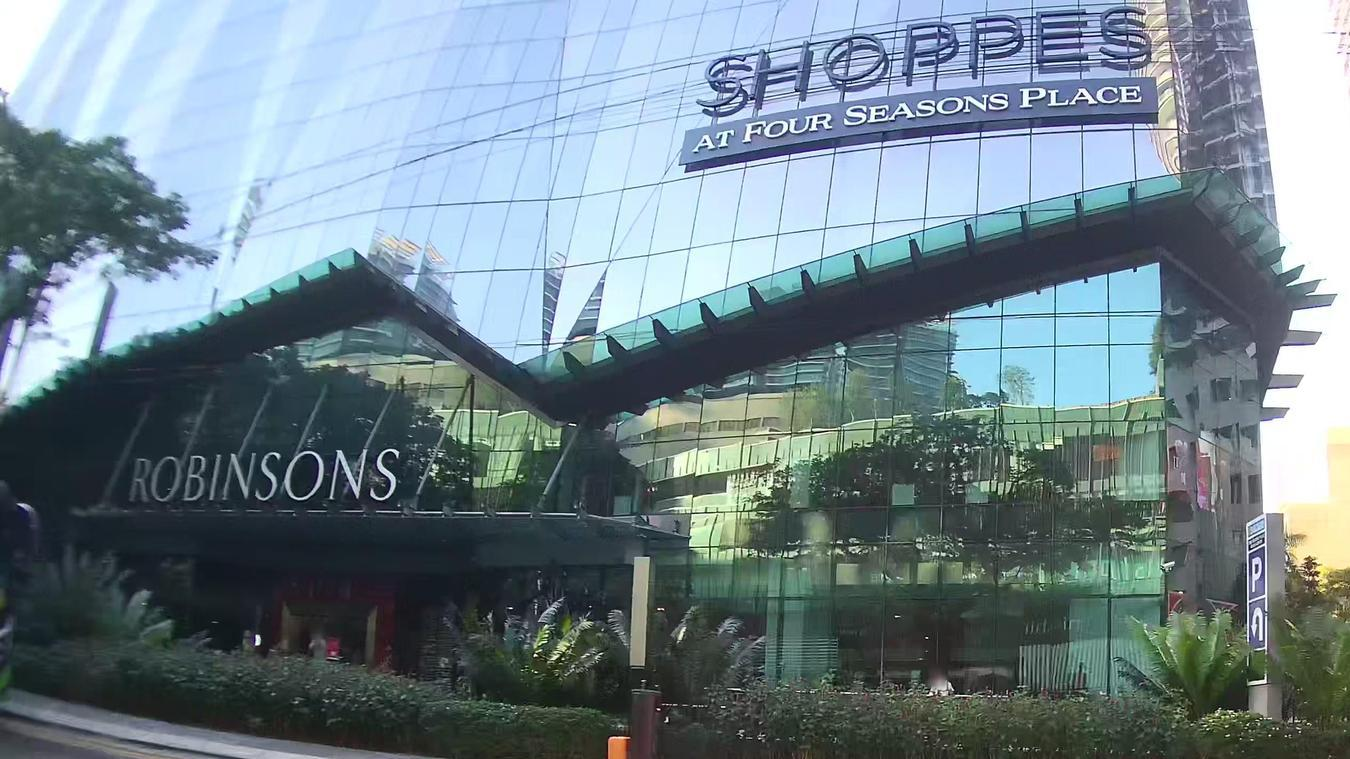
Shoppes at Four Season Place's mall exterior in January 2020

The hotel includes an atrium mall known as Shoppes at Four Seasons Place, also known as Shoppes @ Four Seasons Place KL, located at the ground levels. It is a luxury retail mall which is connected to the building itself and takes up six levels of the tower. Its sister mall is located at the Four Seasons Hotel Macao, Cotai Strip under the name of "Shoppes at Four Seasons". Recently in October 2020, the Robinsons announced that they will be closing their department store at the mall along with its outlet in The Gardens Mall located at Mid Valley City.

== Launch ==
This project which is the first-ever Four Seasons Place in South East Asia, was launched by the former Prime Minister of Malaysia, Najib Razak on 30 January 2013. This event was also accompanied by the Chairman of Venus Assets, Tan Sri Syed Yusof, and witnessed by Sultan Sharafuddin Idris Shah. The project was completed in 2018.

== Criticism ==
The hotel's design and the location were criticised for blocking the view of the national icon, the Petronas Towers. The Malaysian Association of Tour and Travel Agents (MATTA) President KL Tan said in an interview to Channel NewsAsia. "Our Twin Towers are an iconic tourist attraction - they should not be blocked at all. Tourists want to have a nice view and take photos of the twin towers, once the tallest buildings in the world." To defend against this criticism, the then Malaysia's Minister of Tourism and Culture, Nazri Aziz said that "There are those who are willing to pay to stay in such hotels and there would be tourists who would visit a place just to stay in such a hotel."

== Transportation access ==
The building is served by the KJ10 KLCC LRT station on Kelana Jaya Line and the PY21 Persiaran KLCC MRT station on Putrajaya Line. Both stations are within a radius of one kilometre.

== See also ==
- List of tallest hotels
- List of tallest buildings in Malaysia
- List of tallest buildings in Kuala Lumpur
- List of shopping malls in Malaysia
- Merdeka 118
- The Exchange 106
