= Permata Sapura Tower =

Skyscraper in Kuala Lumpur, Malaysia

- Menara Permata Sapura
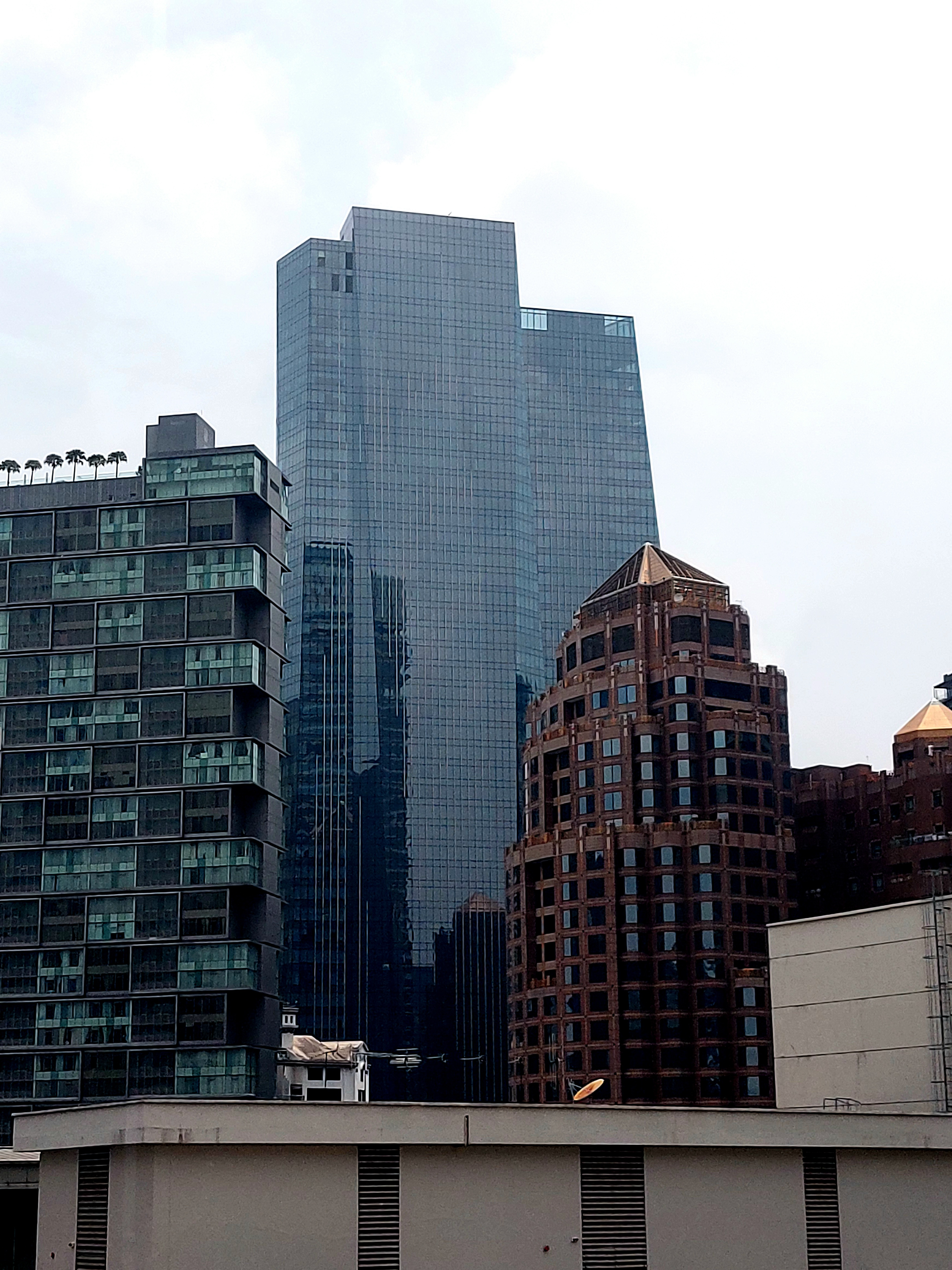
- Permata Sapura Tower, September 2022.
- Interactive map of the Permata Sapura Tower area
- Former names: KLCC Lot 91

General information
- Status: Completed
- Type: Commercial
- Location: Suria KLCC, Level 2, Jalan Pinang, Kuala Lumpur, Malaysia
- Coordinates: 3.1530°N 101.7137°E
- Construction started: 2015
- Completed: 2020
- Owner: KLCC Property Holdings

Height
- Height: 252.5 m (828 ft)

Technical details
- Floor count: 53
- Floor area: 110,072.73 m^{2} (1,184,813.0 ft^{2})

Design and construction
- Architect: Arquitectonica
- Developer: Sapura Resources
- Structural engineer: Leslie E. Robertson Associates

Permata Sapura Tower (or initially known as KLCC Lot 91, Malay: Menara Permata Sapura) is a skyscraper located at the Kuala Lumpur City Centre (KLCC) in Kuala Lumpur, Malaysia. The skyscraper has a height of 252.5 metres (828 feet) with 53 floors. The construction of the skyscraper was completed in 2020 and is currently among the tallest skyscrapers in Malaysia.

Construction of the skyscraper was initially proposed in 2011, when Sapura Resources, a Malaysian property developer, announced a joint-venture with KLCC Property Holdings to develop a plot of land 7,605 m^{2} (81,860 ft^{2}) in area. The construction originally involves a complex of a 46-storey skyscraper, a convention centre and retail podiums on a plot of land known as Lot 91. 80 percent of the project was funded by Maybank, Public Bank Berhad and RHB Bank worth RM1.08 billion (US$258.2 million).

Total floor area for the skyscraper is estimated at 110,072.73 m^{2} (1,184,813.0 ft^{2}).

== See also ==
- List of tallest buildings in Malaysia
- List of tallest buildings in Kuala Lumpur
