= ExxonMobil Tower =

Skyscraper in Kuala Lumpur, Malaysia

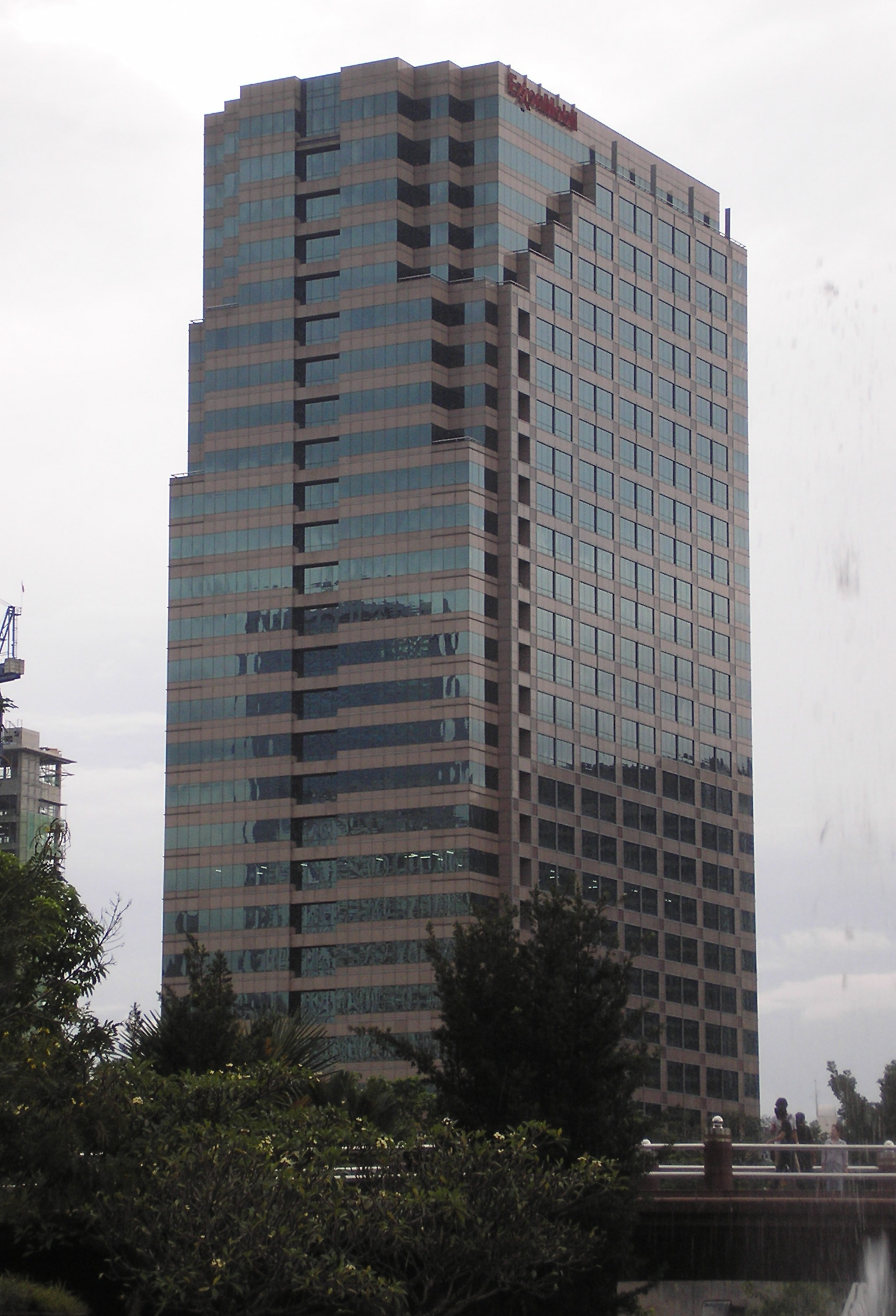
- Interactive map of the ExxonMobil Tower area
- Former names: Menara Esso

General information
- Type: Commercial offices
- Location: Kuala Lumpur City Centre, Malaysia
- Coordinates: 3.1541°N 101.7157°E
- Completed: 1997
- Owner: KLCC Properties
- Management: KLCC Properties

Height
- Roof: 126 m (413 ft)

Technical details
- Floor count: 30
- Floor area: 21,168 sq ft (1,966.6 m^{2})
- Lifts/elevators: 16

Design and construction
- Architect: Kumpulan Senireka Sdn Bhd

ExxonMobil Tower (Malay: Menara ExxonMobil) formerly known as Menara Esso is a skyscraper located in the Kuala Lumpur City Centre of Kuala Lumpur, Malaysia. The building currently is the headquarters of ExxonMobil Malaysia.

It is the first building to be completed in the Kuala Lumpur City Centre development before KLCC Park, Suria KLCC, Maxis Tower and Petronas Twin Towers.

The 126 m (413 ft), 30-storey tower is a rectangular-shaped building, with a virtually column free interior. For aesthetics, the north and south elevations are set-back at level 5, while the north elevation facing the public park is further set-back at levels 22 and 26.

The soft landscaping at Menara ExxonMobil also includes a semi-private garden which leads into the 20-hectare KLCC Park.
