= Lot K, KLCC =

Upcoming building in Kuala Lumpur, Malaysia

Lot K, KLCC is a tentative name of the development project that is underway on Lot K and Lot 185 on Kuala Lumpur City Center, Kuala Lumpur. The development comprising two towers, inclusive of offices and Kuala Lumpur's first luxury Raffles Hotel of between 35 and 77 storeys. The project is being designed by César Pelli Architects, designers of the adjacent Petronas Towers, and the environmental design and engineering firm Neapoli.

== Suria extension ==
The towers would sit on a four-storey shopping complex podium that will be integrated with the present Suria KLCC mall. The new Suria mall extension will be interconnect with the current mall. Integration with the KLCC Park will also be enhanced.
