= Stapled security =

A stapled security is a type of financial instrument. It consists of two or more securities that are contractually bound to form a single salable unit; they cannot be bought or sold separately. Stapled securities have especially been used in Australia; stapling is relatively uncommon in the rest of the world.

The two parts of the salable unit are usually (a) a share in a company and (b) a unit in a trust related to the company. For example, a company that manages a trust may have units of the trust attached (stapled) to the shares of the company. The company may be responsible for managing the fund and development opportunities, and may charge the trust a fee. The trust, in turn, is the legal owner of the property assets.

For example, a unit of shares in a company can be bound to unit of an investment trust and they must be purchased and sold together. The investment trust will own the assets and the company will manage the assets.

== Pros and Cons ==
Stapling gives the management company an incentive to work for the benefit of the unit holders, rather than just their own shareholders. Some stapled securities may provide minor tax advantages.

One of the disadvantages of stapling is that you cannot buy one without the other.

Sometimes stapling may change the security you have. For example, you may move further away from being a creditor of the company and closer towards being a shareholder. (Bear in mind that shareholders generally get paid last, if at all, when a company is wound up.)

Stapled securities are a bit more complicated and no two are the same. If they are not listed they can be difficult to sell.
