= Kuala Lumpur City Centre =

Central business district in Malaysia

- Pusat Bandar Kuala Lumpur
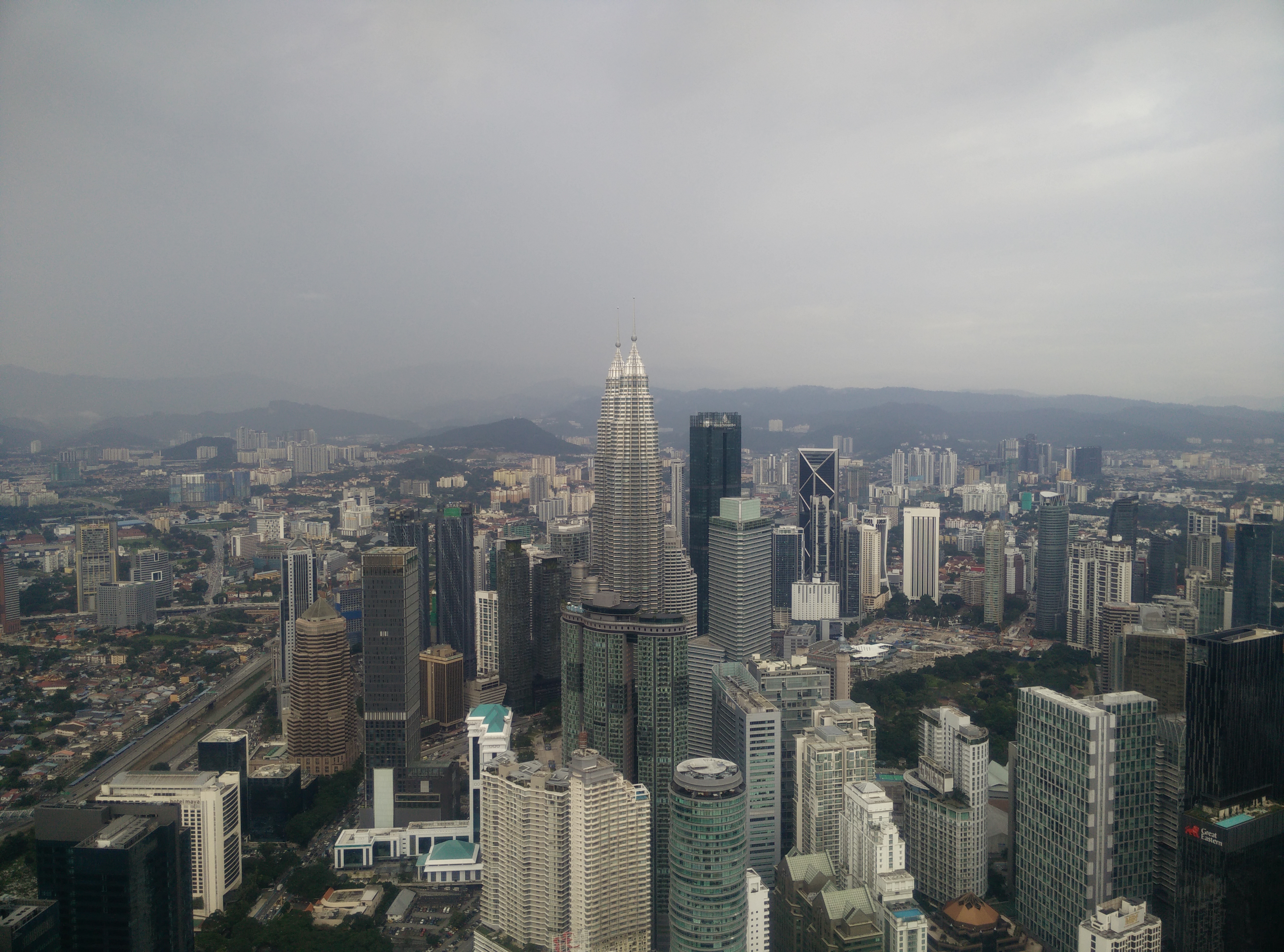
- Aerial view of KLCC in 2020
- Alternative names: KLCC, KL City Centre

General information
- Type: Central business district
- Location: Kuala Lumpur, Malaysia
- Coordinates: 3.15687°N 101.71473°E
- Groundbreaking: March 1993
- Construction started: 1 January 1987
- Completed: 1 January 1990
- Inaugurated: 31 August 1999; 27 years ago
- Renovated: 13 January 1991
- Owner: KLCC Property Holdings Berhad (KLCCP)

Website
- klcciconic.com.my

Kuala Lumpur City Centre (KLCC) is a multipurpose development area in Kuala Lumpur, Malaysia. Located in the heart of Malaysia, KLCC refers to the area within and surrounding the KLCC Park, but the term has also been widely used to refer to the buildings nearby to the vicinity.

Designed to be a city within a city, the 100-acre site hosts the tallest twin buildings in the world, the fourth tallest hotel in the world, a shopping mall, office buildings and several hotels. A public park and a mosque have also been built in the area and are open to everyone. Areas within KLCC is cooled via district cooling located on the property. The whole precinct was developed by KLCC Property Holdings Berhad (KLCCP) of the KLCC Group of Companies, a property investment arm of Petronas.

== History ==
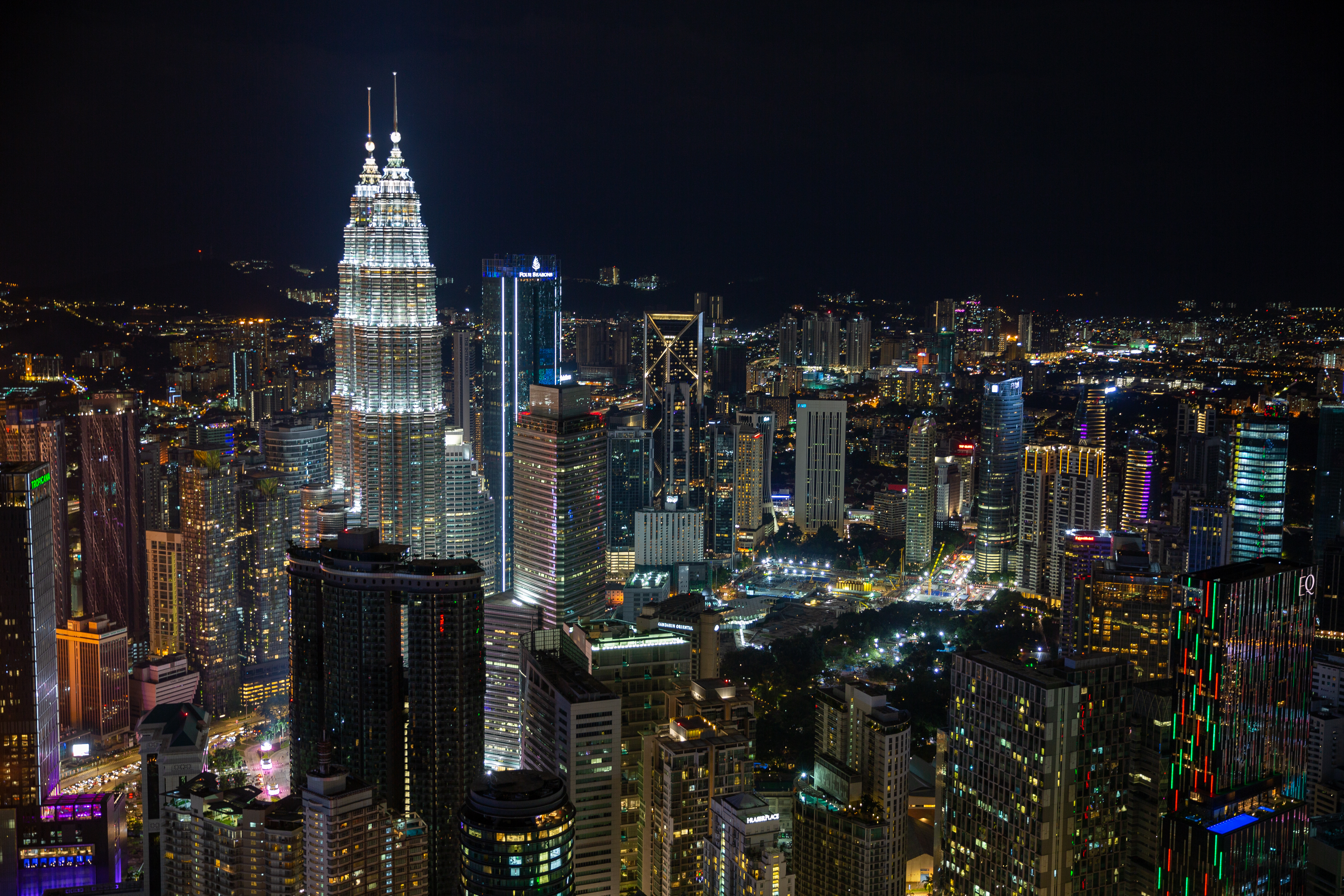
View of the KLCC precinct at night from the Kuala Lumpur Tower.

The site of the Kuala Lumpur City Centre was historically part of an affluent suburban residential area north of the old Kuala Lumpur town, linked to the town via Ampang Road and populated by bungalows and mansions dating as far back as the colonial early-20th century. The centrepiece of the area was the original site of the Selangor Turf Club, with many houses constructed around the site to capitalise on views of the racing course. As large scale development moved northwards from old Kuala Lumpur town after the 1950s, development of the area gradually shifted from low-density residential homes to high-density commercial complexes and offices, raising the appeal of developing the suburb into a new commercial centre for Kuala Lumpur. In 1988, the Selangor Turf Club site and adjoining residential parcels were sold to be cleared away for the KLCC project; the Turf Club was subsequently relocated to Serdang. In the subsequent years after the relocation of the Turf Club, more surrounding residential plots were acquired for further development of KLCC.

== Geographical definition ==
The KLCC development is (unofficially) defined as the area bounded by Jalan Ampang in the north, Jalan P Ramlee in the west, Jalan Pinang and Jalan Kia Peng in the south, and Jalan Stonor in the east.

For land administration purposes, the KLCC precinct is listed as the 58th section, Bandar Kuala Lumpur.

Clockwise from north, KLCC is surrounded by Kampung Baru, Ampang Hilir, Tun Razak Exchange, Bukit Bintang and Bukit Nanas.

KLCC, forming part of Kuala Lumpur's central business district, falls within Bukit Bintang parliamentary constituency.

== Development zone ==
KLCC is an area with mixed developments in various stages of construction. The area is divided into several plots of land, each with a specific purpose. Zoning of the development is based on the KLCC Masterplan.

Lot	Development Type	Name	Notes
A	Office	Menara Maxis	Maxis' headquarters
B	Office	Petronas Twin Towers	Suria KLCC is located at the base of the towers
C	Office / Commercial	Menara 3 Petronas (Menara Carigali)	Extension of Suria KLCC, Marini's on 57 rooftop bar is located at Level 57
R	Commercial	Suria KLCC	Shopping mall of the KLCC development
D	Hotel	Mandarin Oriental Hotel Kuala Lumpur	Club Kyō is located in the basement level of the hotel
D1	Unknown	-	Was a work site, a tunnel from Lot C to here has been built. Currently an open car park managed by KLCC Parking Management Sdn Bhd.
E	Commercial	Kuala Lumpur Convention Centre	The Aquaria KLCC is located just beneath the convention centre
E1	Commercial	Kuala Lumpur Convention Centre	The Aquaria KLCC is located just beneath the convention centre
F	Commercial	Kuala Lumpur Convention Centre	The Aquaria KLCC is located just beneath the convention centre
G1	Commercial	Kuala Lumpur Convention Centre	The Aquaria KLCC is located just beneath the convention centre
G	Hotel	Traders Hotel	-
91	Commercial	Permata Sapura Tower	-
H	Commercial	ExxonMobil Tower	-
J	Office	-	Currently an open car park managed by KLCC Parking Management Sdn Bhd
J1	Office	-	Currently an open car park managed by KLCC Parking Management Sdn Bhd
P2	Office	-	Currently an open car park managed by KLCC Parking Management Sdn Bhd
185	Mixed Development	Lot K, KLCC Fairmont Kuala Lumpur Towers	Was in construction, currently works on the site have been put on hold.
K	Mixed Development	Lot K, KLCC Fairmont Kuala Lumpur Towers	Was in construction, currently works on the site have been put on hold.
176	Mixed Development	Lot K, KLCC Fairmont Kuala Lumpur Towers	Was in construction, currently works on the site have been put on hold.
177	Utility	KLCC District Cooling Centre	-
178	Public Space	As Syakirin Mosque	-
187	Public Space	KLCC Park	An urban park
L	Mixed Development	KLCC retail podium and gallery space Ombak KLCC Persiaran KLCC MRT underground station	Currently under construction; a new retail mall component and gallery for Petronas
L1	Mixed Development	KLCC retail podium and gallery space Ombak KLCC Persiaran KLCC MRT underground station	Opened on March 16, 2023; part of the MRT Putrajaya Line
M	Mixed Development	Tower M (KLCC East Gate)	Foundation works for a proposed skyscraper, was part of the KLCC park and car park
N	Unknown	-	Temporarily being used as a diversion for KLCC Tunnel due to KLCC Retail Mall constructions
P	Residential	The Binjai On The Park	The one and only residential component of the whole development
P1	Residential	The Binjai On The Park	The one and only residential component of the whole development

== Offices ==
The 88-storey towers were built using mostly reinforced concrete, with steel-and-glass facades to resemble Islamic motifs which were intended to reflect the official and majority religion of Malaysia. The cross section of the tower resembles Rub el Hizb, which further solidifies the Islamic motif in the tower design.

=== ExxonMobil Tower ===
ExxonMobil Tower was completed 1 January 1997 and it is the headquarters of the Malaysian subsidiary of ExxonMobil, one of the largest listed companies in the world.

The 126 m (413 ft), 30-storey tower is a rectangular-shaped building, with a virtually column-free interior. For aesthetics, the north and south elevations are set back at level 5, while the north elevation facing the public park is further set back at levels 22 and 26.

=== Menara Carigali ===
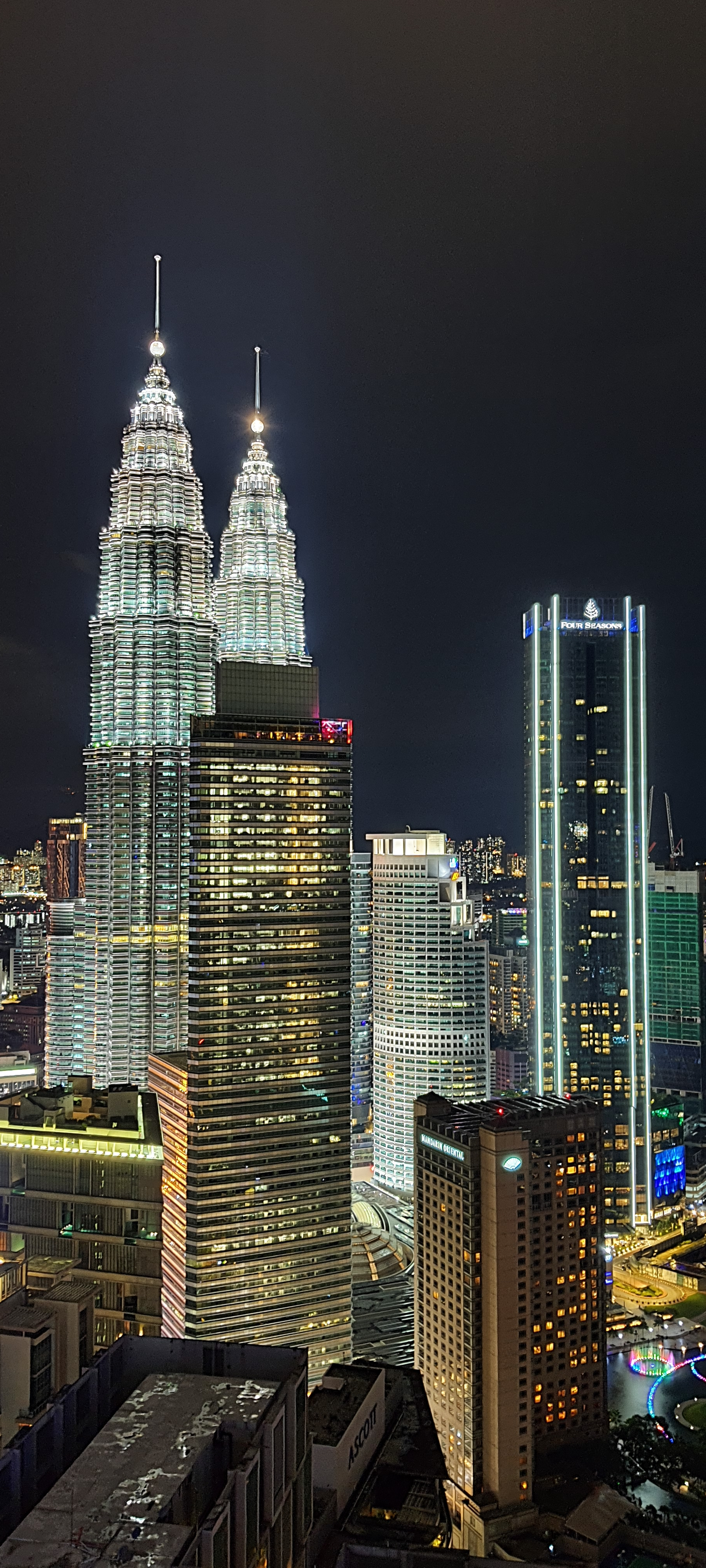
High-rise office blocks and hotels around Petronas Twin Towers, from left (directly in front of the Twin Towers) is Menara Carigali, Menara Maxis, Mandarin Oriental Hotel and Four Seasons Place Kuala Lumpur.

Officially Menara 3 Petronas, this tower is a 60-story tower which was completed in 2012. The tower is connected with the shopping mall Suria KL.

The tower is also designed by César Pelli with construction started in 2006 and finished in 2012. The tower has a separate entrance facing the Mandarin Oriental hotel and also has a tunnel link towards Lot D1. Lot D1 will be the site of a future development by the owner, KLCC Properties. Like the Petronas Twin Towers, the Building Services Engineer was Flack + Kurtz.

The cross section of the tower features two geometric shapes, a square and a rectangle. The rectangle shape in the building starts at the ground floor and extends up to the 40th floor. The triangle shape extends to the top of the tower. At the top of the tower, a crown completes the design. It is expected the crown will hold the tower's company logo.

=== Menara Maxis ===
Menara Maxis is the headquarters of Maxis Communications, one of Malaysia's largest telecommunication companies.

== Suria KLCC ==
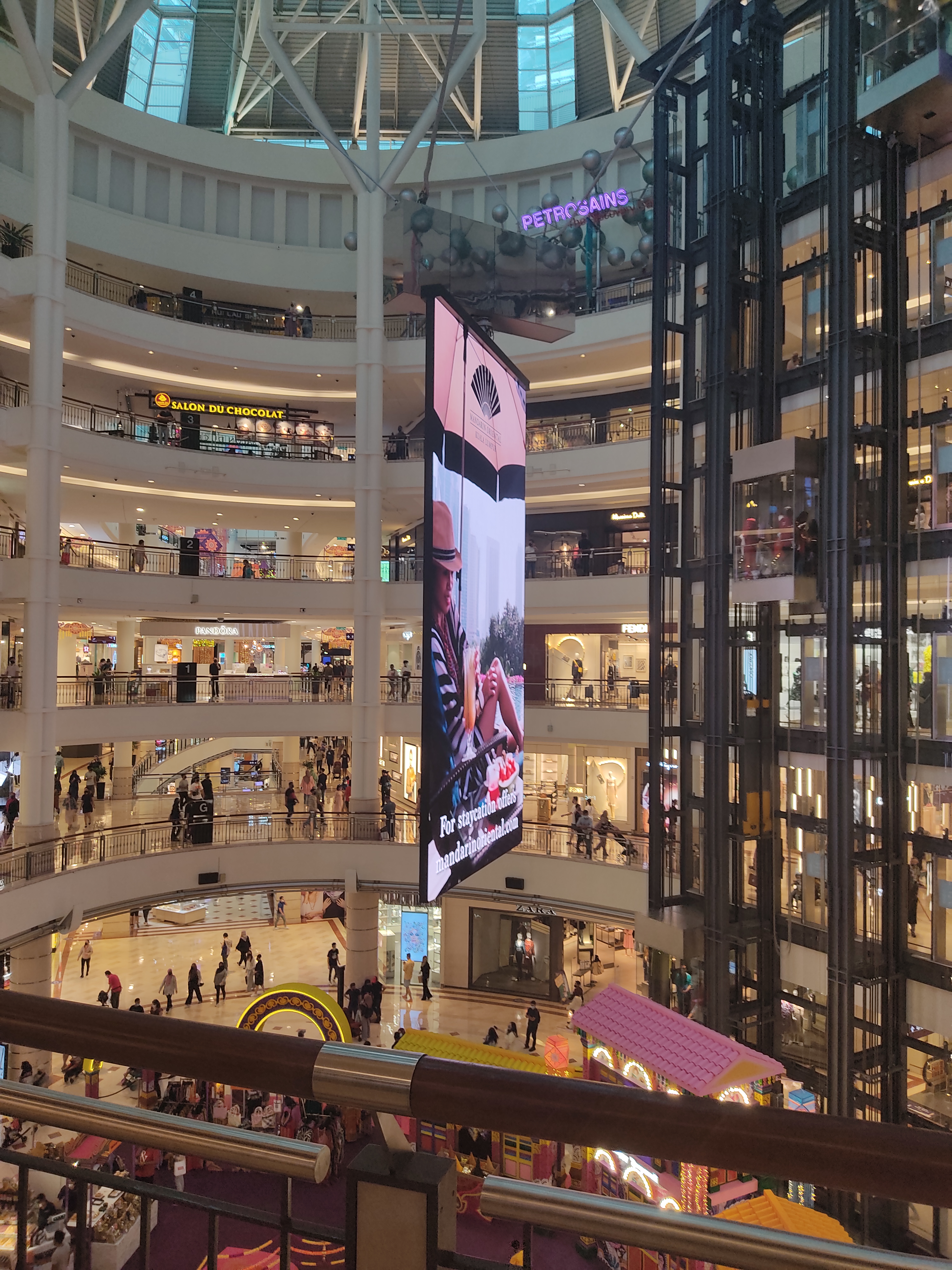
Interior of Suria KLCC in 2021

Suria KLCC is currently the only and main commercial centre in the KLCC area. The shopping mall occupies space underneath the Petronas Twin Towers and shares its parking lot with it. The six-story shopping mall was extended to Petronas Menara Tiga in 2011.

The mall is linked to the Kuala Lumpur Convention Centre via an underground pedestrian tunnel, which in turn is connected to the Bukit Bintang shopping district via an elevated pedestrian walkway.

The Building Services Engineer was Flack + Kurtz who is currently part of the WSP | Parsons Brinkerhoff Company.

== Hotels ==
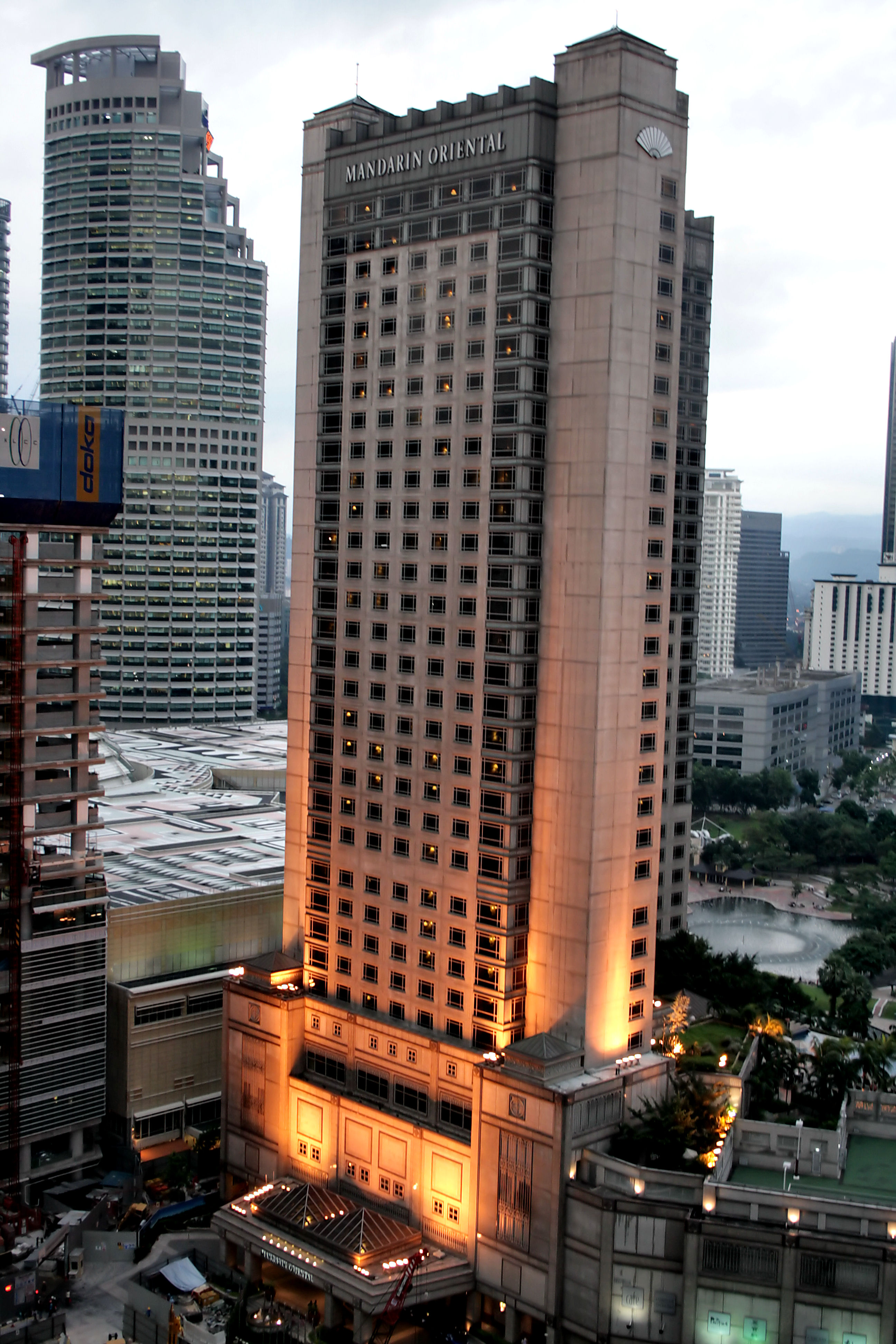
Mandarin Oriental Kuala Lumpur in KLCC

There are currently four hotels in the KLCC precinct:

- Mandarin Oriental is the main hotel which sits between Suria KLCC and Kuala Lumpur Convention Centre.
- Traders Hotel, which is owned by Petronas and run by Shangri-La Hotels, connects directly with the convention centre. This hotel has 571 rooms.
- The Four Seasons Place Kuala Lumpur, managed by Four Seasons Hotel and Resort, is located within the KLCC vicinity.
- Grand Hyatt Kuala Lumpur, facing Jalan Pinang, just next to the convention centre.
- The Ruma Residences is also just a stroll away from KLCC Park and Pavilion Shopping Mall.

== Kuala Lumpur Convention Centre ==
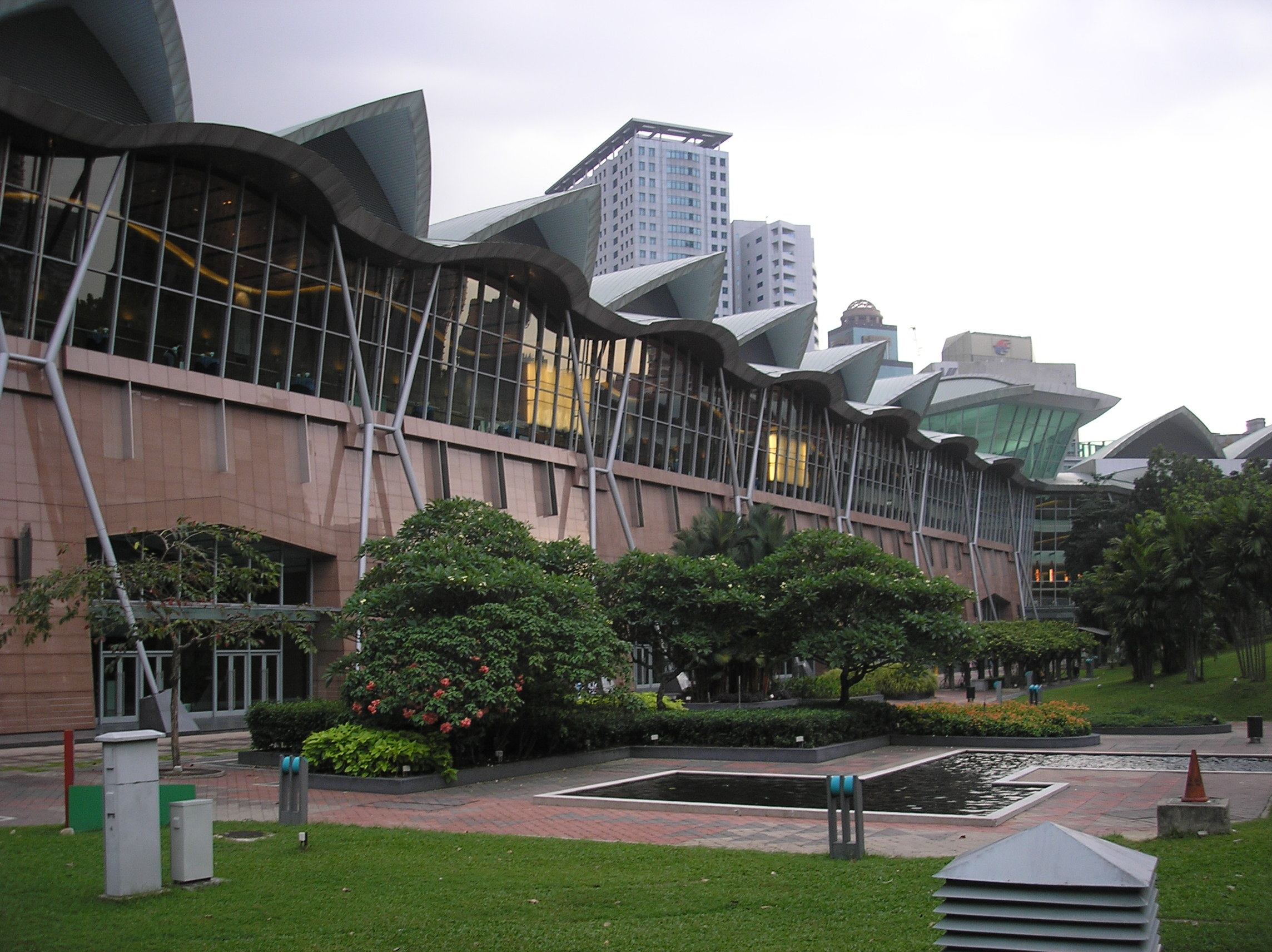
The Kuala Lumpur Convention Centre

The KLCC area has a 1,300,000-square-foot (120,000 m^{2}) convention centre known as the Kuala Lumpur Convention Centre. The total function area is around 216,000 square feet (20,100 m^{2}). The convention centre is directly connected with the Traders Hotel. The Impiana Hotel, which is owned and operated by KLCC Properties, developer of the KLCC area, is connected via a walk bridge. In the master plan, there will be several more buildings to be built near or on the convention centre area.

== The Binjai On The Park ==
The Binjai On The Park is the only residential area within the development. The residential space is two 42-story buildings having an unobstructed view of the Petronas Twin Towers. It is designed by Allen Jack + Cottier (known famously as AJ+C), the Australian-based architect with regional presence in Malaysia, Vietnam and China. The residential towers is the most expensive in Malaysia with a 19,500 square feet penthouse has been sold for a record RM50 million.

== Public area ==
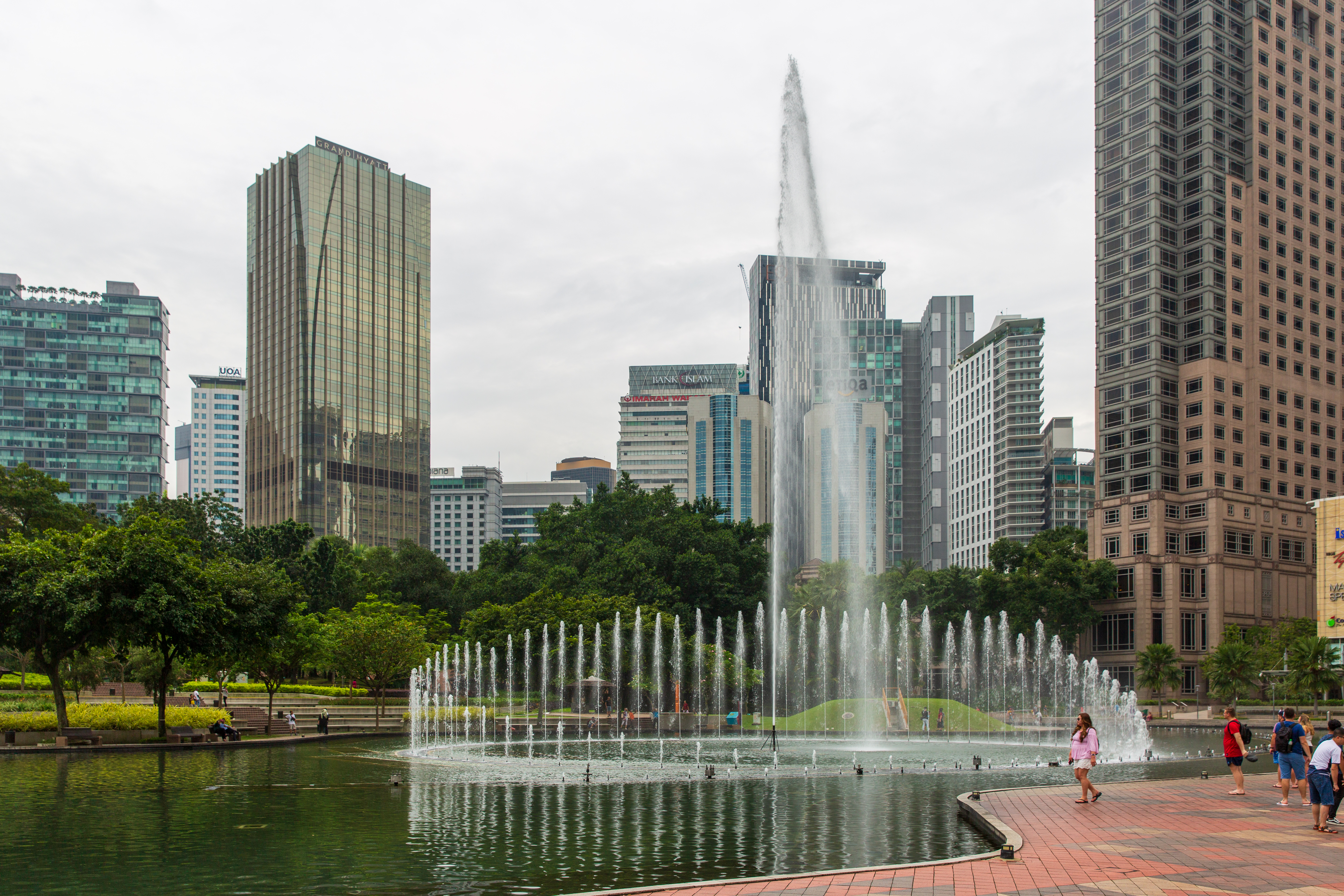
The KLCC Park

At the centre of the property lies KLCC Park. The park is one of the last designs of notable Brazilian park designer Roberto Burle Marx. The park holds a jogging track, a public swimming pool, several children's playground and a man-made lake complete with water fountains.

The area also has a mosque known as As Syakirin Mosque which has the capacity to hold 12,000 people. Naturally, many religious activities such as Friday prayers are conducted here.

== Access ==
=== Public transport ===
KLCC is served by a light rapid transit (LRT) line at KLCC LRT station, served by the Kelana Jaya line. The underground station is located in the basement of Avenue K, a shopping complex opposite Suria KLCC across Jalan Ampang. The station is connected to Suria KLCC via an underground pedestrian walkway. It is also a bus hub for the RapidKL bus network, the largest public transport operator in Kuala Lumpur.

The district is also served by the Persiaran KLCC MRT station, formerly known as KLCC East station, on the Putrajaya line. The second phase of the line opened on 16 March 2023 where this underground station is included. It will be directly connected to the KLCC Retail Podium and the Tower M in the future.

A dedicated taxi stand, which utilises the coupon system, is available at the shopping mall entrance. Patrons who do not wish to use the system have the option to walk up to another taxi stand which is situated on the main road.

=== Road network ===
Although the area is bordered by five main roads, main road access is through Jalan Ampang, Jalan Sultan Ismail and the Ampang–Kuala Lumpur Elevated Highway (AKLEH). The AKLEH access is quite unique in the sense that the highway has direct tunnel access to the area's extensive underground parking lot.

KLCC is also connected to Jalan Ampang via an underground tunnel.

=== Other access ===
The developer (Petronas) has spent RM100 million (USD24 million) as part of its social contribution programme to build an elevated, air-conditioned walkway from the Kuala Lumpur Convention Centre to the Bukit Bintang shopping district. From there, pedestrians can access the Bukit Bintang and Raja Chulan stations on the KL Monorail line, and the Bukit Bintang MRT station on the Kajang line.

== Utility ==
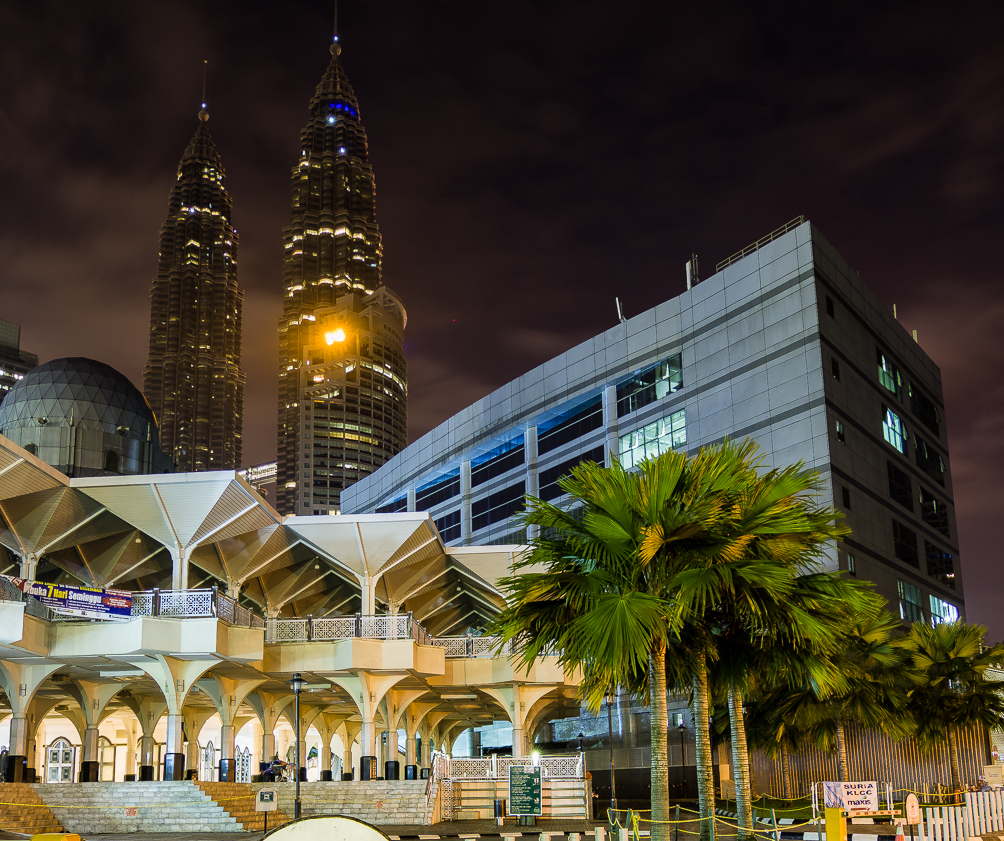
KLCC District Cooling in January 2014 with As Syakirin Mosque and Petronas Twin Towers to the left

=== KLCC District Cooling ===
KLCC District Cooling is a building that is used to provide district cooling for the KLCC vicinity. Situated in Lot 40, it is a 30,000 ton gas-powered turbine-driven chilled water unit providing cool air not only to Petronas Twin Towers and Suria KLCC, but also to Maxis Tower, Menara Exxon Mobil, Kuala Lumpur Convention Centre, and Mandarin Oriental Kuala Lumpur as well as As Syakirin Mosque. This district cooling concept is the first implementation in Malaysia. The engineer for the District Cooling Center was Flack + Kurtz (currently part of the WSP | Parsons Brinkerhoff Company). The plant was renovated and upgraded and activated in 2015. The current capacity is approximately 70,000 tons and has 180,000 ton hours of ice storage.

The building is situated behind As Syakirin Mosque.

== See also ==
- KL Sentral - Malaysia's main railway station with mixed development, in Brickfields
- Tun Razak Exchange - new financial centre between Bukit Bintang and Maluri
- KL Metropolis - major centre for international trade and exhibitions in Segambut
- Bangsar South City - an integrated property development built on the former Kampung Kerinchi in Lembah Pantai
- Bukit Bintang City Centre - integrated development on the site of the former Pudu Jail, now containing Southeast Asia's first LaLaport mall from Japan.
- Bandar Malaysia - a mothballed transit oriented development to be built on the former Sungai Besi Air Base
- Merdeka 118 - 118-story skyscraper near Petaling Street and Merdeka Stadium, including 118 Mall
- Mid Valley City - mixed development in Lembah Pantai which features 2 shopping malls
- Putrajaya - fully planned city in southern Selangor. Currently the administrative capital of Malaysia
