= Aquaria KLCC =

Oceanarium in KLCC, Kuala Lumpur, Malaysia

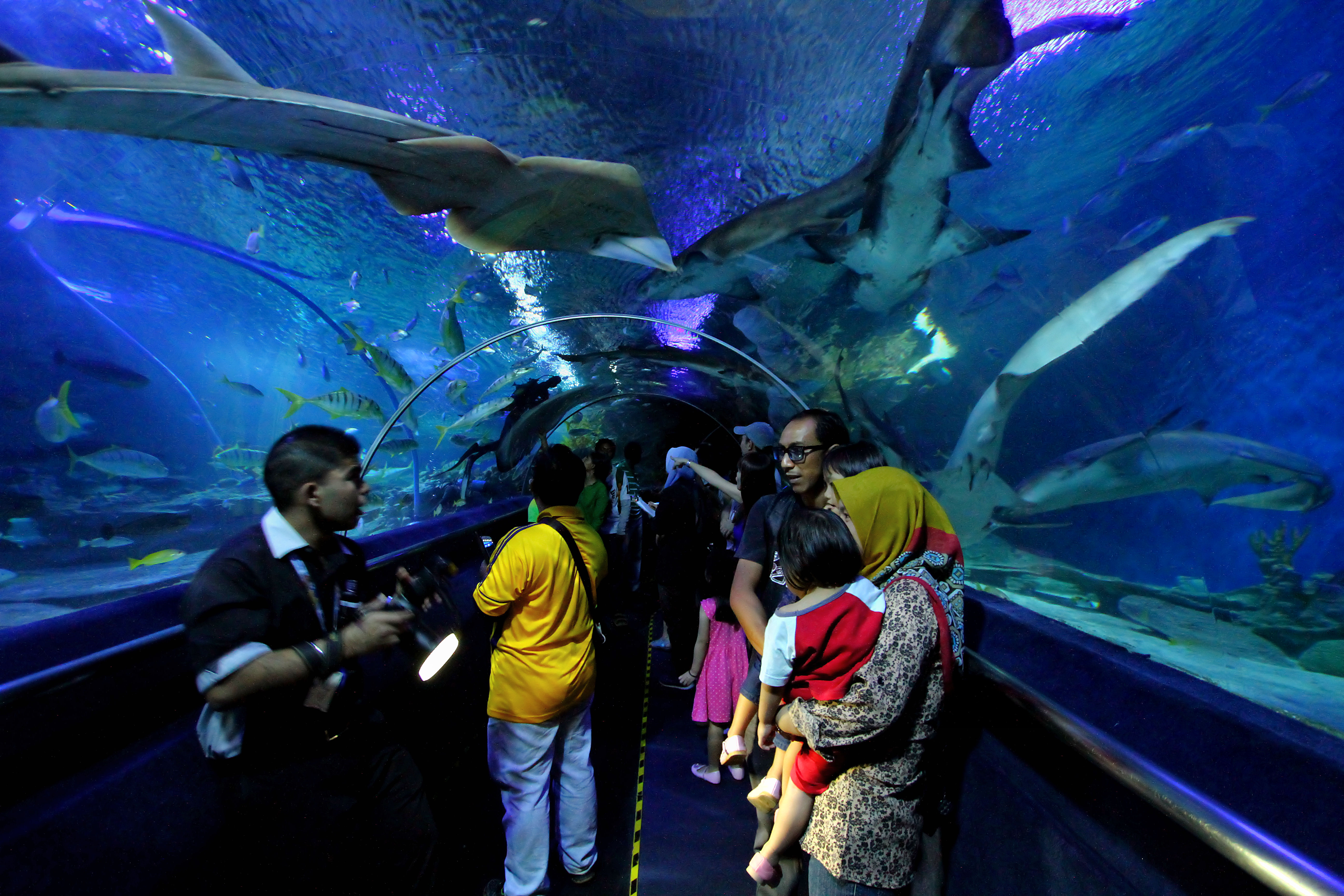
- Interactive map of Aquaria KLCC
- 3.1533927°N 101.713078°E
- Date opened: August 2005
- Location: Kuala Lumpur Convention Centre, Kuala Lumpur, Malaysia
- Owner: Aquawalk Sdn. Bhd.
- Website: www.aquariaklcc.com/

The Aquaria KLCC is an oceanarium located beneath Kuala Lumpur Convention Centre within Kuala Lumpur City Centre in Kuala Lumpur, Malaysia.

== History ==
Construction for Aquaria KLCC started in 2003. It was officially opened in August 2005.

== Features ==
Featuring 60,000 square feet (5,600 m^{2}) in two levels with a 90-metre (300 ft) underwater tunnel, Aquaria KLCC houses over 250 different species and over 5,000 land and aquatic animals from Malaysia and around the world. Interactive information kiosks on fish and turtle conservation. It includes a themed retail area of about 5,000 square feet (460 m^{2}). Aquaria KLCC is based on the journey of water from the land to the sea. The journey starts in the misty highlands, down through rivers, through the rainforest and mangroves to the coral reefs into the deep blue sea. There is a large food-court just outside the aquarium with many choices of food.

The Aquaria is located in the lower levels of the Kuala Lumpur Convention Centre.

At the end of the Aquaria, visitors will inadvertently go through a mundane souvenir shop, to which ends at the food court.

== See also ==
- Kuala Lumpur Convention Centre
- List of tourist attractions in Malaysia
