= Petronas Tower 3 =

Skyscraper in Kuala Lumpur, Malaysia

Coordinates: 3°09′24″N 101°42′40″E

- Menara Petronas 3
- Petronas Tower 3 in September 2026
- Former names: Carigali Tower (Menara Carigali)

General information
- Status: Completed
- Type: Office and retail
- Location: Kuala Lumpur City Centre, Kuala Lumpur, Malaysia
- Construction started: Late 2006
- Topped-out: 2011
- Completed: 2012
- Cost: MYR 665 million for superstructure
- Owner: KLCC Properties
- Operator: KLCC Properties

Height
- Roof: 267 m (876 ft)
- Top floor: 246 m (807 ft)

Technical details
- Floor count: 60
- Floor area: 900,000-square-foot (84,000 m^{2})

Design and construction
- Architect: Pelli Clarke Pelli Architects
- Developer: KLCC Property Holdings (KLCCP)
- Main contractor: Daewoo Engineering And Construction

Petronas Tower 3, also known as Carigali Tower, is a 60-story, 267-meter-tall skyscraper in KLCC, Kuala Lumpur, Malaysia. It is Malaysia's eighth tallest building and it is also part of the Petronas Towers complex. The 246-meter high building also features a 21-meter high crown-like structure on the top of the tower, making it 267 meters high. The building features a 6-level extension to the Suria KLCC shopping mall, while the rest of the floors above are solely made up of office spaces. It is the headquarters of Petronas Carigali, the E&P subsidiary of Petronas and some of the local subsidiaries of Multinational Corporations such as Microsoft Malaysia. Along with the Kuala Lumpur Convention Centre and the Binjai On The Park condominiums, the development of Lot C falls under Phase 2 of the KLCC project. Its development cost is reported at RM1 billion.

The Marini's on 57 restaurant and bar is located on the 57th floor of the building. It has a dedicated private lift that takes visitors directly to the rooftop bar and restaurant which is burned on 1 November 2025 due to gas leaks.

On 1 November 2025, a fire broke out on Petronas Tower 3. It involved a restaurant in one of the building's upper floors, but the fire was successfully extinguished by firefighters.

== Construction ==
Construction started in late 2006 and completed in 2012. In January 2011, KLCC Properties Holdings Berhad (KLCCP) awarded an RM665mil contract for the superstructure to Daewoo Engineering and Construction, which began building the top structure in March 2009. The retail mall section is expected to be ready by 2010, followed by the office block component by October 2011. The office tower will house 840,000 square feet (78,000 m^{2}) net lettable office space, while the retail portion of the building will measure 140,000 square feet (13,000 m^{2}). The development will also feature a tunnel link to the adjacent Lot D1, KLCC for future development.

== See also ==
- Petronas Towers
- List of tallest buildings in Kuala Lumpur
