= KLCC Property Holdings =

Malaysian property investment company

KLCC Property Holdings Berhad KLCC Real Estate Investment Trust
- Company type: Public
- Traded as: MYX: 5235SS
- ISIN: MYL5235SS008
- Industry: Property development; Property investment
- Founded: 7 February 2004; 22 years ago
- Headquarters: Dayabumi Complex, Jalan Sultan Hishamuddin, Kuala Lumpur, Malaysia
- Key people: Krishnan C.K. Menon (chairman); Hashim Wahir (CEO)
- Services: Office & retail real estate; Hotel operations; Facilities management
- Revenue: ▲RM8.35 billion (2020)
- Operating income: ▲RM3.501 billion (2020)
- Net income: ▲RM2.516 billion (2020)
- Total assets: ▲RM16.80 billion (2020)
- Total equity: ▲RM13.85 billion (2020)
- Website: www.klcc.com.my

KLCC Property Holdings Berhad (KLCCP) is a Malaysian property investment company which owns and manages office, retail and hotel properties in Kuala Lumpur, mainly in the Kuala Lumpur City Centre (KLCC) area. Among the properties owned or managed by the company and its stapled real estate investment trust are the Petronas Twin Towers (the tallest buildings in the world from 1998 to 2004), Suria KLCC, the Mandarin Oriental Kuala Lumpur and Menara Maxis.

The company, along with KLCC Real Estate Investment Trust (KLCC REIT) – which it manages – form the KLCCP Stapled Group. KLCCP shares are stapled with KLCC REIT units; the stapled securities are listed on Main Market of Bursa Malaysia Securities Berhad. The group is 75%-owned by Petronas through direct and indirect interests.

KLCCP was incorporated in 2004 as a vehicle to offer a portion of Petronas's property holdings to the public. In 2013, the company undertook a corporate restructuring, which involved the transfer of three prime real estate office properties, including the Petronas Towers, into the newly formed KLCC REIT. KLCCP Stapled Group is the largest REIT in Malaysia with a net asset value of RM12 billion in June 2015.

== History ==
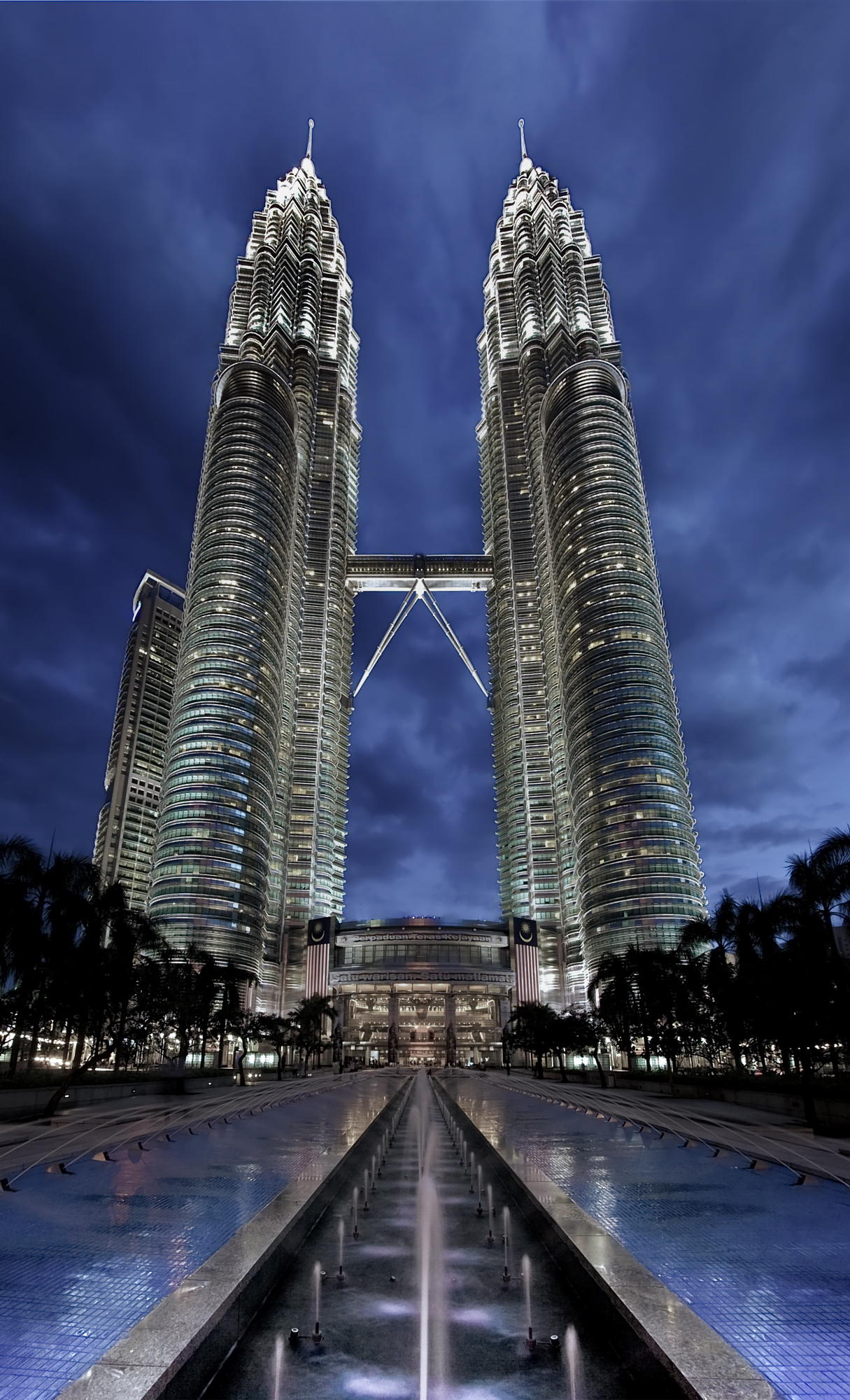
The Petronas Towers and Suria KLCC at their base.

KLCC Property Holdings is the property investment arm of Malaysia's national oil company, Petronas. In 2004, Petronas sold a 46% interest in KLCCP in one of the largest initial public offerings in Malaysia that year.

In 2013, the company undertook a corporate restructuring in which it injected the Petronas Twin Towers, Petronas Tower 3 and Menara ExxonMobil into the newly created KLCC REIT. Consequently, the shares of KLCCP and units of KLCC REIT were stapled (at a ratio of 1 share for every 1.8 million units) to create the KLCCP Stapled Group. The transfer of the properties was done to take advantage of income tax exemption for earnings by a real estate investment trust in Malaysia. The stapled securities were re-listed on the Main Market of Bursa Malaysia Securities Berhad in May 2013. The REIT – which is sharia-compliant – is managed by KLCC REIT Management Sdn Bhd, a wholly owned subsidiary of KLCCP.

The group has first right of refusal to acquiring future developments by its majority shareholder, KLCC Holdings Sdn Bhd (the 100%-owned property development subsidiary of Petronas). KLCC Holdings is currently developing an office building and Fairmont Hotel with Qatari Diar REIT (Lot 185) and an office building on Lot 91 with Sapura Resources Berhad. Both are located in the KLCC area.

It is also looking to redevelop the area surrounding the Dayabumi Complex, including constructing a 60-storey hotel, office and retail building known as Dayabumi.

== Portfolio ==
KLCCP Stapled Group has four main business segments: Property investment - Office, Property investment - Retail, Hotel operations, and Management services.

KLCC REIT's portfolio comprises Petronas Twin Towers, Petronas Tower 3 and Menara ExxonMobil, with a combined net lettable area of 4.5 million square feet.

Other properties held by KLCCP include the Dayabumi Complex on Jalan Sultan Hishamuddin, the Mandarin Oriental Kuala Lumpur (75%), the Suria KLCC shopping centre (60%) and Menara Maxis (33%).
