= Kuala Lumpur Convention Centre =

Convention center in KLCC, Kuala Lumpur, Malaysia

Coordinates: 3°09′14″N 101°42′48″E

- Pusat Konvensyen Kuala Lumpur
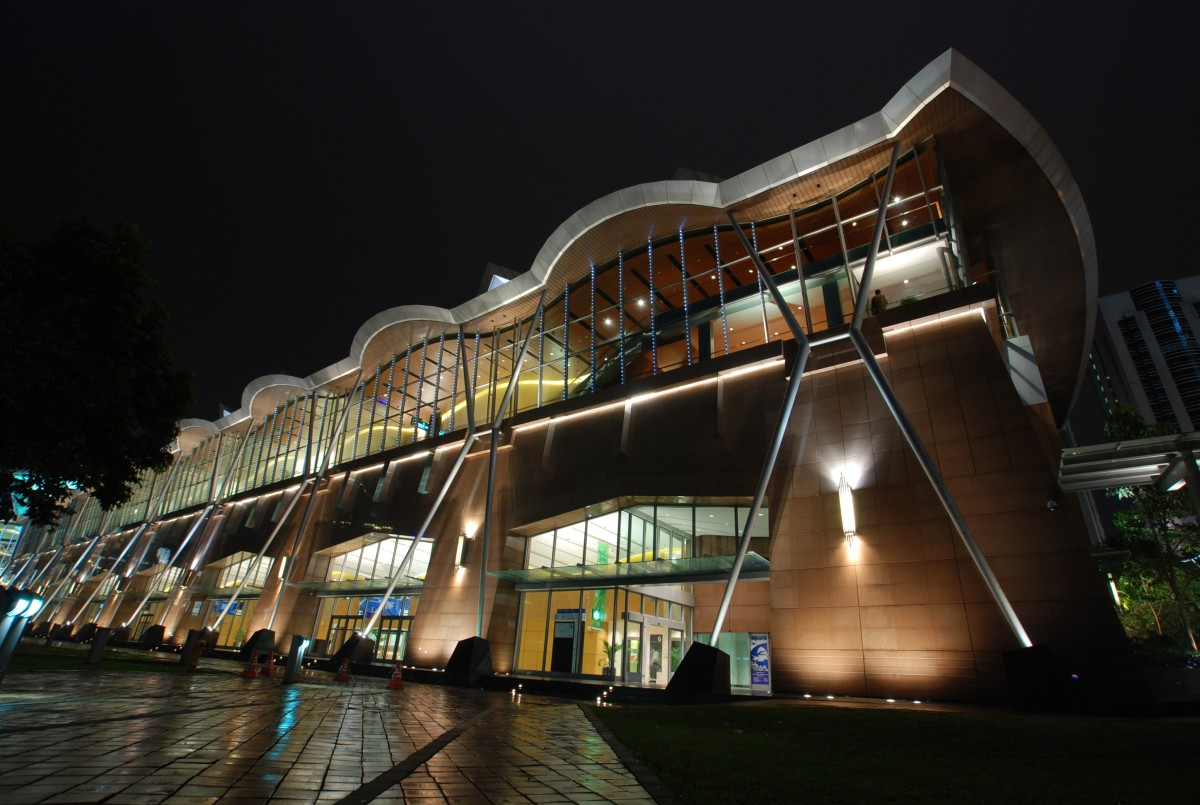
- Interactive map of the Kuala Lumpur Convention Centre area
- Alternative names: KL Convention Centre, KLCC Convention Centre

General information
- Status: Completed
- Type: Conference and Exhibition Centre
- Architectural style: Modernist, Postmodern
- Location: Kuala Lumpur City Centre, Kuala Lumpur, Malaysia
- Construction started: 17 February 2003
- Opening: May 2005
- Owner: Kuala Lumpur Convention Centre Sdn Bhd
- Operator: Convex Malaysia Sdn Bhd

Technical details
- Floor count: 8

Design and construction
- Architect: Akitek Jururancang

Other information
- Seating capacity: 3,000 (Plenary Hall)

Website
- www.klccconventioncentre.com

The Kuala Lumpur Convention Centre (Malay: Pusat Konvensyen Kuala Lumpur), also known as the KL Convention Centre, is a purpose-built convention and exhibition centre located in the Kuala Lumpur City Centre (KLCC) development in Kuala Lumpur, Malaysia. It was launched by Prime Minister Mahathir Mohamad on 11 February 2003.

The management of the convention centre is handled by Convex Sdn Bhd, a joint venture between KLCC Holdings and ASM Global.

The convention centre was the recipient of the 2015 AIPC Innovation Award.

During the COVID-19 pandemic, it was used as a mass vaccination centre.

== Description ==
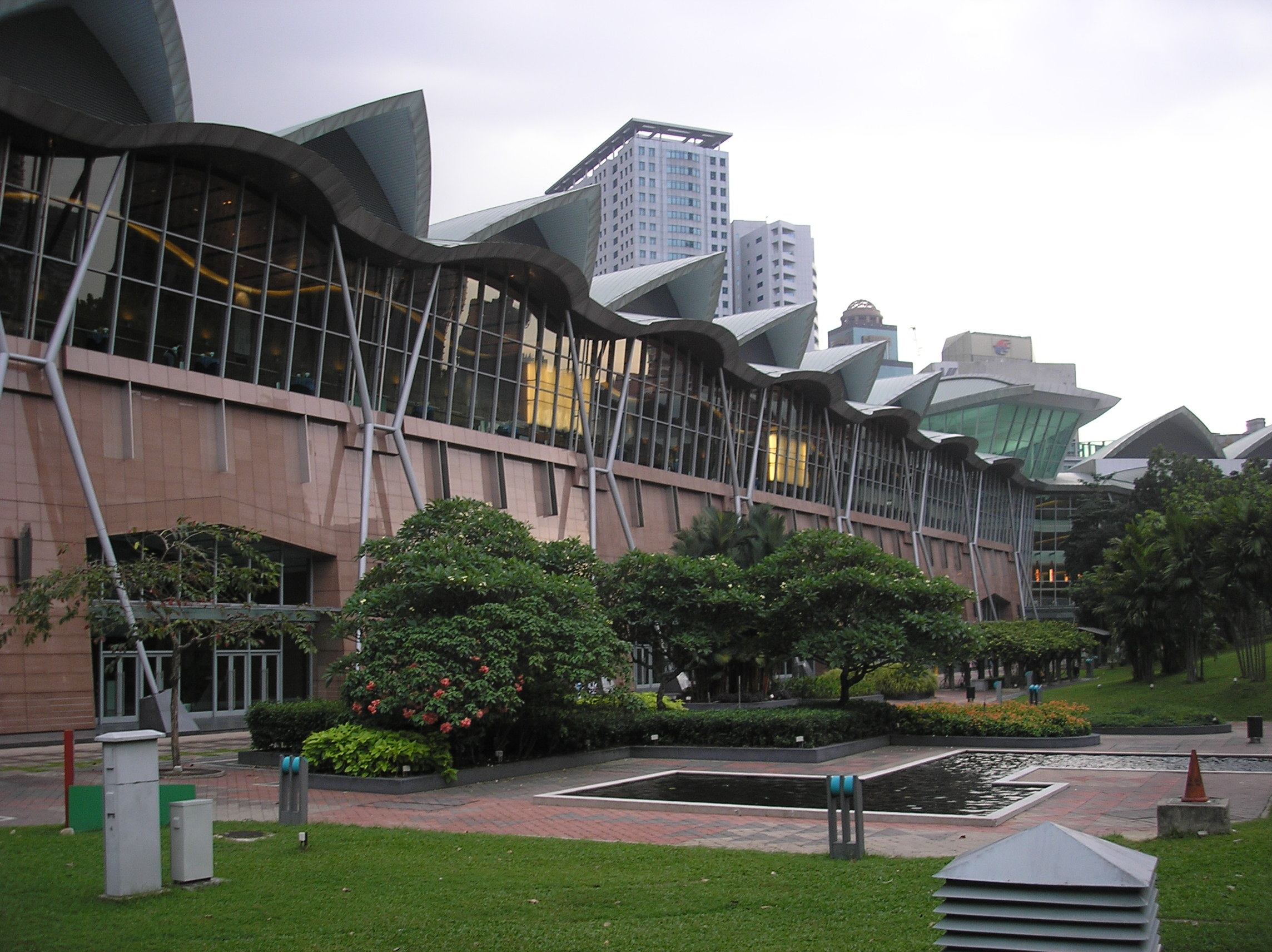
Exterior, viewed from KLCC Park.

The building was designed with Modernist and Postmodern architectural elements, and is located in the heart of the Kuala Lumpur City Centre precinct.

== Major past events at the Convention Centre ==
- 67th MDA/FDI International Dental Convention & Trade Exhibition 2010 (2200 delegates)
- XVIII FIGO World Congress of Gynecology and Obstetrics (FIGO) (8,294 delegates), 2006
- 12th APLAR Congress Of Rheumatology 2006 (2,026 delegates)
- 6th Asian & Oceanian Epilepsy Congress 2006 (1,000 delegates)
- The 11th ASEAN Summit 2005
- 3rd International Asia Pacific Society of Infection Control (APSIC) 2007
- Scientific Excellence in Islamic Civilisation Exhibition 2007
- 39th ASEAN Ministerial Meeting 2007
- 16th World Congress on Information Technology 2008
- 13th International Congress of Infectious Diseases 2008
- My Fair Lady the Musical 2007
- Chicago the Musical 2007
- Beauty and the Beast the Musical 2008
- Comic Fiesta (annually)
- 68th MDA/FDI International Dental Convention & Trade Exhibition 2010 (2500 delegates)
- 6th World Chambers Congress (3–5 June 2009, 1,000 delegates)
- Stem Cells and Immunity Conference (1–3 October 2009, 700 delegates)
- Asia Pacific Digestive Week (19–22 September 2010, 1,500 delegates)
- International Greentech & Eco Products Exhibition & Conference Malaysia (14–17 October 2010)
- 10th International Conference on Low Vision (VISION 2011) (21–24 February 2011, 3,000 delegates)
- 18th Asian Pacific Congress of Cardiology (7–10 April 2011, 2,000 delegates)
- 22nd Pacific Science Congress (13–17 June 2011)
- The 2nd International Greentech & Eco Products Exhibition & Conference Malaysia (14–17 October 2010)
- Asia's No.1 Water and Wastewater Industry Event (27–29 March 2012)
- 102nd Rotary International Conference (3,000 Delegates)
- 2013 Global Entrepreneurship Summit (11–12 October 2013)
- EAGE/FESM Joint Regional Conference Petrophysics Meets Geoscience (17–18 February 2014)
- IECEX 2014 - February 2014
- 2015 Global Round of the World Scholar's Cup (3000 participants)
- 2015, 128th IOC Session, where the IOC elected the host city of the 2022 Winter Olympics
- Ed Sheeran - x Tour (16 March 2015)
- 5 Seconds of Summer - Sounds Live Feels Live World Tour (2 March 2016)
- 2018 Global Round of the World Scholar's Cup (4100 participants)
- Ninth Session of the Word Urban Forum (Feb. 7-13, 2018)
- Mariah Carey - Number 1's Tour (16 October 2018)
- Why Don't We - 8 Letters World Tour (14 November 2019)
- The Kuala Lumpur Summit 2019 (18–21 December 2019)
- COVID-19 vaccination location for Kuala Lumpur region
- Japan Expo Malaysia
- 46th and 47th ASEAN Summits (26–27 May, 26-28 October 2025)
- 2025 Global Investigative Journalism Conference (20-24 November)

== Economic impact ==
Since its opening in June 2005, through to 31 March 2017, the centre has hosted over 12,276 events, bringing into Kuala Lumpur over 20.9 million delegates and visitors. Of these delegates and visitors, 7% were international/regional.
