= Maxis Tower =

Office building in Kuala Lumpur, Malaysia

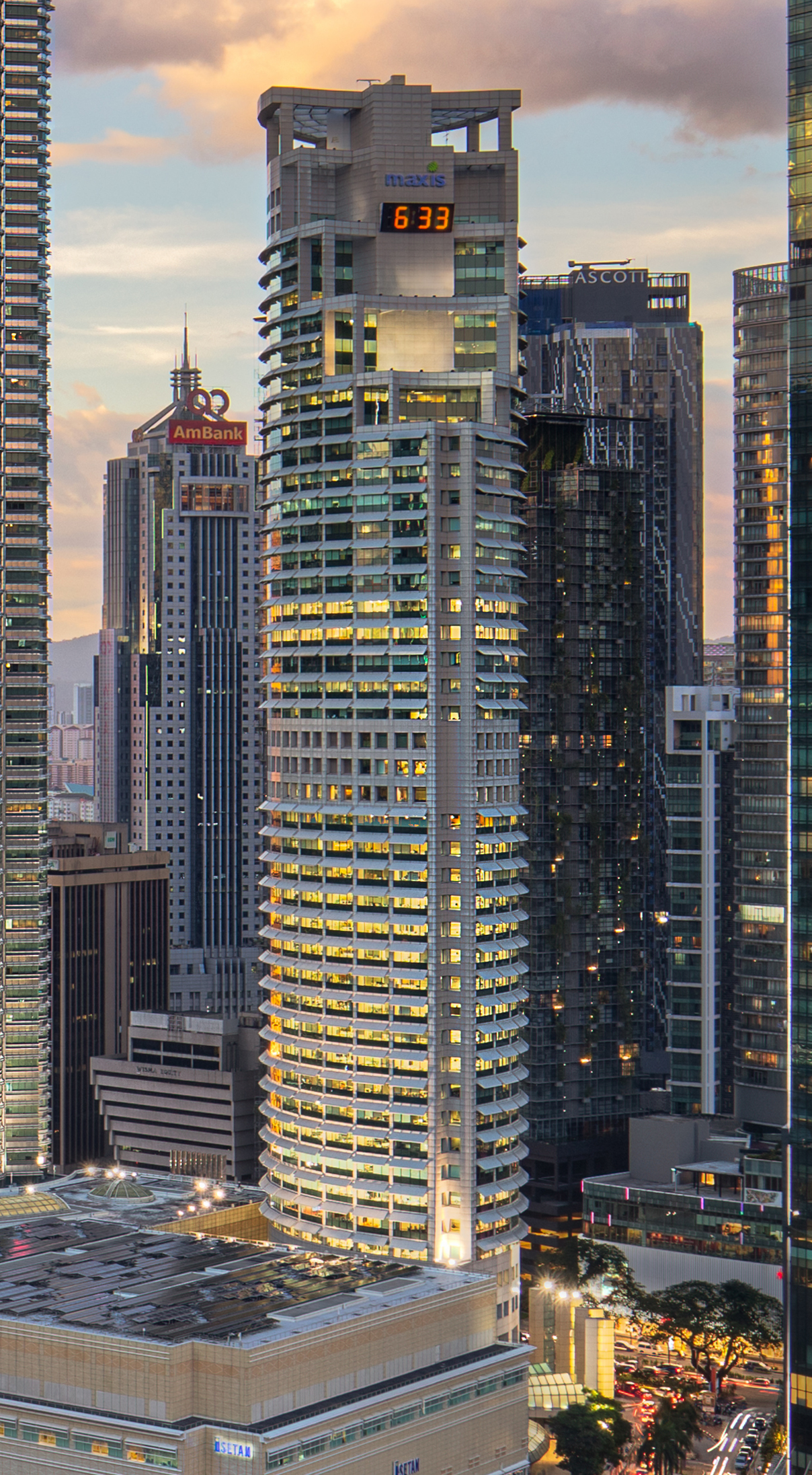
- Maxis Tower in 2019
- Interactive map of the Maxis Tower area
- Alternative names: Menara Maxis; Ampang Tower

General information
- Type: Commercial offices
- Location: Jalan Ampang; Kuala Lumpur, Malaysia
- Coordinates: 3.1580°N 101.7130°E
- Construction started: 1994
- Completed: 1996

Height
- Roof: 212 m (696 ft)

Technical details
- Floor count: 49
- Floor area: 74,874 m^{2} (805,940 sq ft)
- Lifts/elevators: 9

Design and construction
- Architect: Roche-Dinkeloo
- Structural engineer: Thornton Tomasetti
- Services engineer: SM Consulting Engineers Sdn Bhd

Maxis Tower (Malay: Menara Maxis) is a 49-storey, 212 m (696 ft) office skyscraper in Kuala Lumpur City Centre, Kuala Lumpur, Malaysia. Designed by Roche-Dinkeloo, the tower serves as headquarters of Maxis Communications and Tanjong Plc Group of Companies.

Maxis Tower was developed by KLCC Properties Holdings Berhad (KLCCP) under Phase 1 of the KLCC project. The building is owned by Impian Klasik Sdn Bhd, in which Tanjong holds a 67% stake and KLCCP holds a 33% stake. Maxis Tower is situated in the northwest corner of the KLCC development, adjacent to the Petronas Twin Towers. As with its neighbouring twin towers, Maxis Tower features an aluminium and glass cladding facade.

== See also ==
- List of tallest buildings in Kuala Lumpur
