= Ombak KLCC =

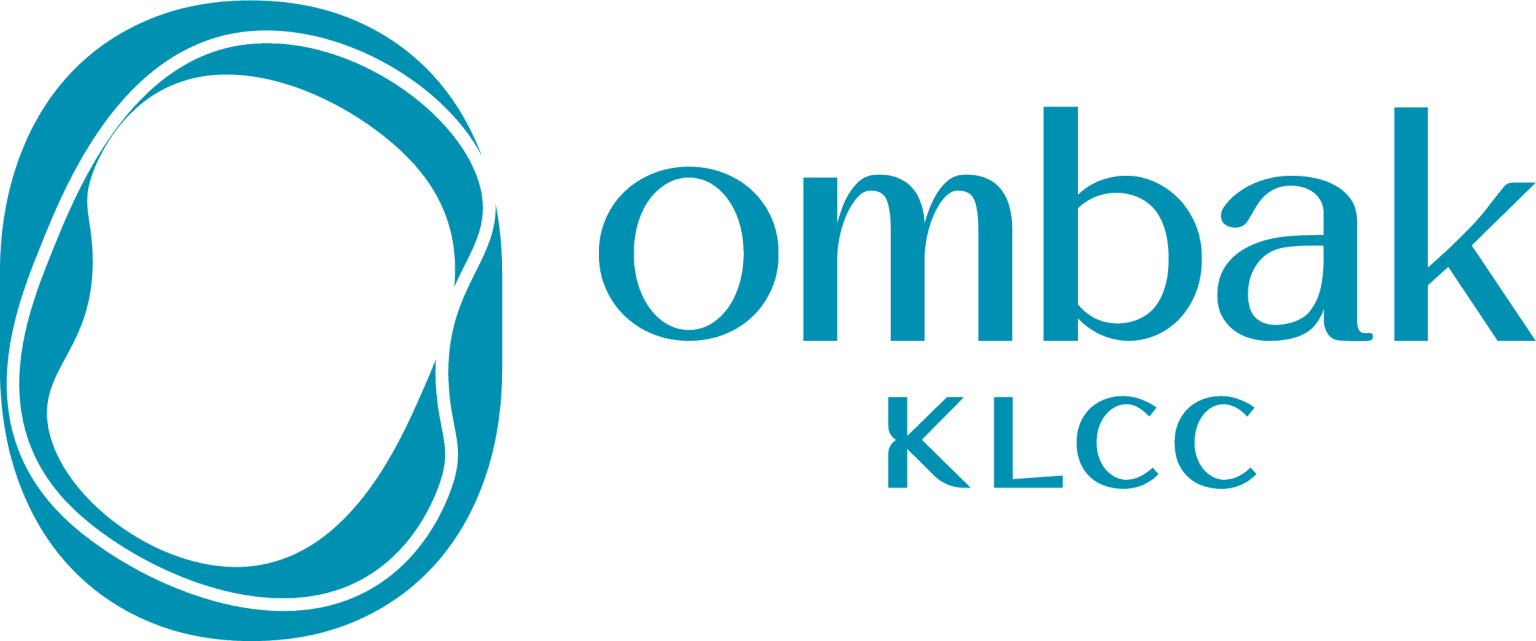

- Ombak KLCC in September 2026
- Location: Kuala Lumpur, Malaysia
- Coordinates: 3°09′25″N 101°43′04″E
- Opened: 21 August 2026
- Developer: KLCC Property Holdings
- Manager: KLCC Holdings Sdn Bhd
- Owner: KLCC Holdings Sdn Bhd
- Num. of stores: ~120
- Floor area: 422,709 sq ft (NLA)
- Floors: 6 retail levels, 3 basement levels
- Public transit: PY21 Persiaran KLCC MRT station
- Website: ombakklcc.com.my

Ombak KLCC is a retail podium and shopping mall in Kuala Lumpur, Malaysia. Developed by KLCC Property Holdings, a property arm of Petronas, the development is situated on a 4.03-acre (1.63 ha) site along Persiaran KLCC and Jalan Binjai within the Kuala Lumpur City Centre (KLCC) precinct. Construction of the complex commenced in the second quarter of 2019, and it officially opened to the public on 21 August 2026, hosting national Merdeka celebrations themed "Jiwa Merdeka" from 28 to 31 August 2026.

== Overview ==
Ombak KLCC comprises a six-storey retail podium and three basement levels, housing approximately 120 retail units with a total net lettable area (NLA) of 422,709 square feet (39,271 m^{2}). It is conceived as the final major commercial development completing the perimeter ring of buildings around KLCC Park.

The primary cultural anchor of the mall is Galeri Petronas, which occupies approximately 126,356 square feet (11,739 m^{2}) across two dedicated levels, including an outdoor sculpture terrace. Following a preview exhibition titled The First Glimpse in August 2026, the gallery is scheduled to become fully operational by the fourth quarter of 2027. The mall also hosts pop-up and retail offerings, including Malaysia's first official Pokémon Center and a Nintendo pop-up store opening on 12 September 2026.

== Architecture and engineering ==
The building was designed by London-based architectural firm Kohn Pedersen Fox (KPF), with design principal Mustafa Chehabeddine serving as the lead architect. The exterior architecture is characterized by fluid, double-curved ribbon-like cladding that wraps around the podium structure, referencing both rhythmic ocean waves (ombak in Malay) and indigenous Malaysian craft traditions of woven textiles.

A signature engineering element of the development is a massive cantilevered section extending outward towards the public plaza, anchored by a deep structural truss that spans approximately 60 metres (200 ft) back into the ground. Internally, the mall is arranged around a sunlit, twisting central atrium featuring organically curved floor slabs and intentionally misaligned escalators, designed to maximize multi-level sightlines and create visual interaction across terraces. The rooftop incorporates a landscaped public viewing terrace, offering direct panoramic vantage points of the adjacent Petronas Twin Towers.

=== Future-proofing ===
To maximize land utilization on the final large commercial plot in the precinct, the development was structurally future-proofed to allow for the construction of a supertall skyscraper—the planned 700-metre tall Tower M—directly above the podium without disrupting everyday retail operations. This required the installation of foundation piles reaching depths of approximately 120 metres (390 ft) and a 5-metre (16 ft) thick foundation raft during the initial construction phase.

== Accessibility ==
Ombak KLCC acts as a multimodal pedestrian conduit within the eastern quarter of the KLCC precinct. It is directly integrated with the underground Persiaran KLCC MRT station on the Putrajaya Line, with two station portals opening into the development and a third positioned across the street. The mall is situated less than a minute's walk from the As Syakirin Mosque, and features future underground pedestrian links planned at Level B1 to connect with the broader KLCC subterranean walkway network.

Vehicular access is provided via Persiaran KLCC and Jalan Binjai, connected to an underground basement parking facility. Above ground, covered pedestrian walkways connect the complex to Suria KLCC and the Petronas Twin Towers through KLCC Park, supplemented by a complimentary buggy shuttle service operating at 30-minute intervals.

== Gallery ==
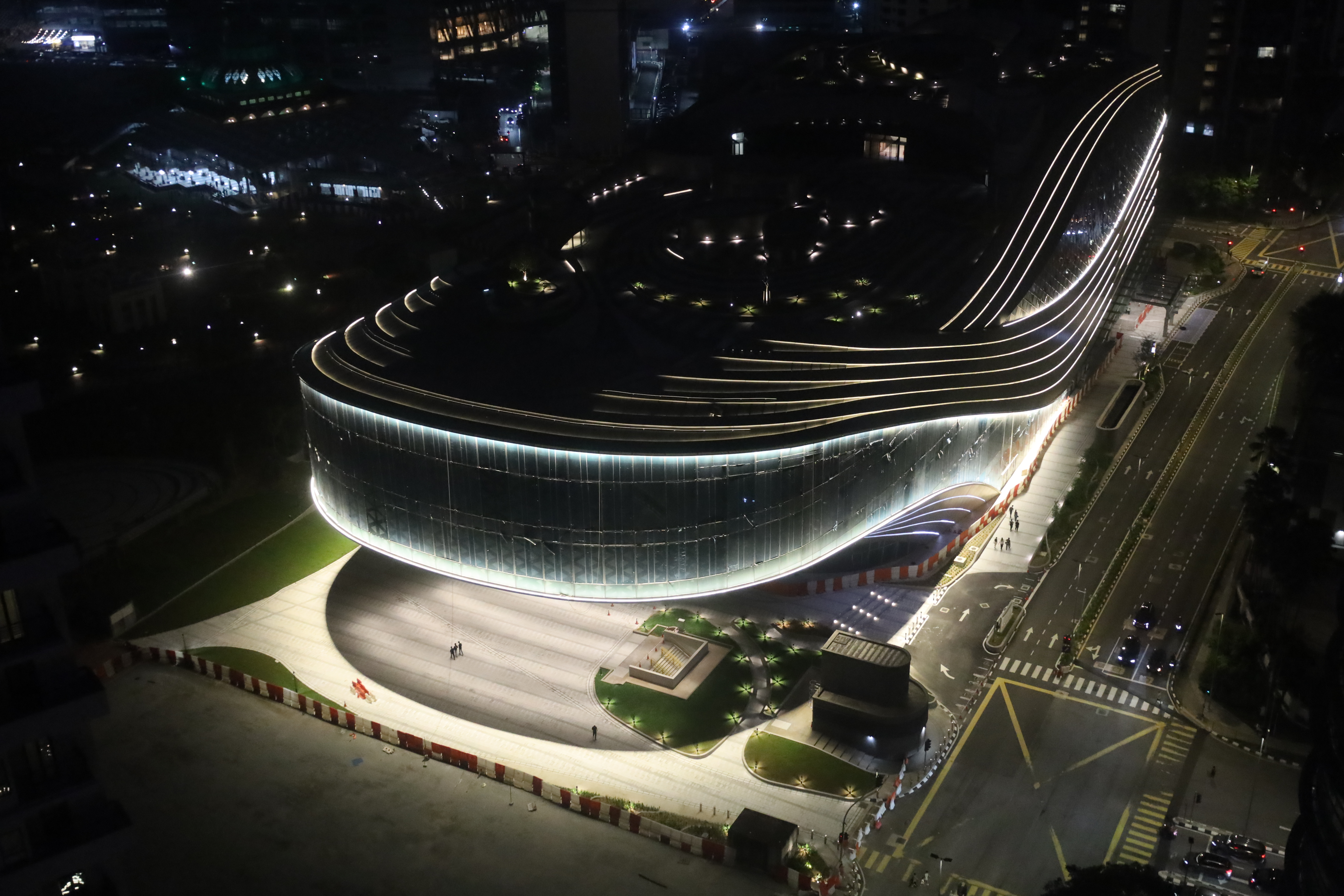
The mall at night

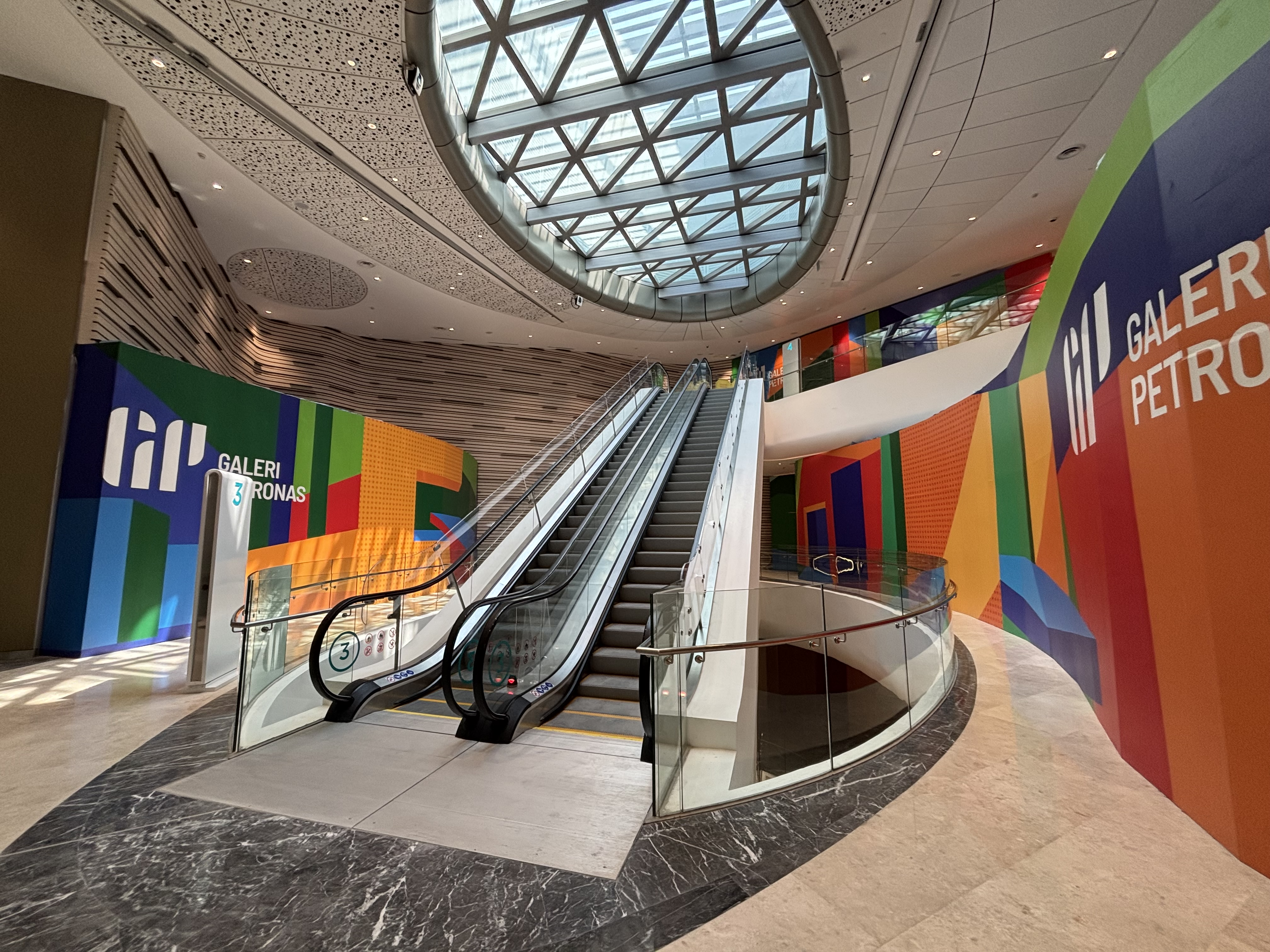
Future Galeri Petronas in the mall

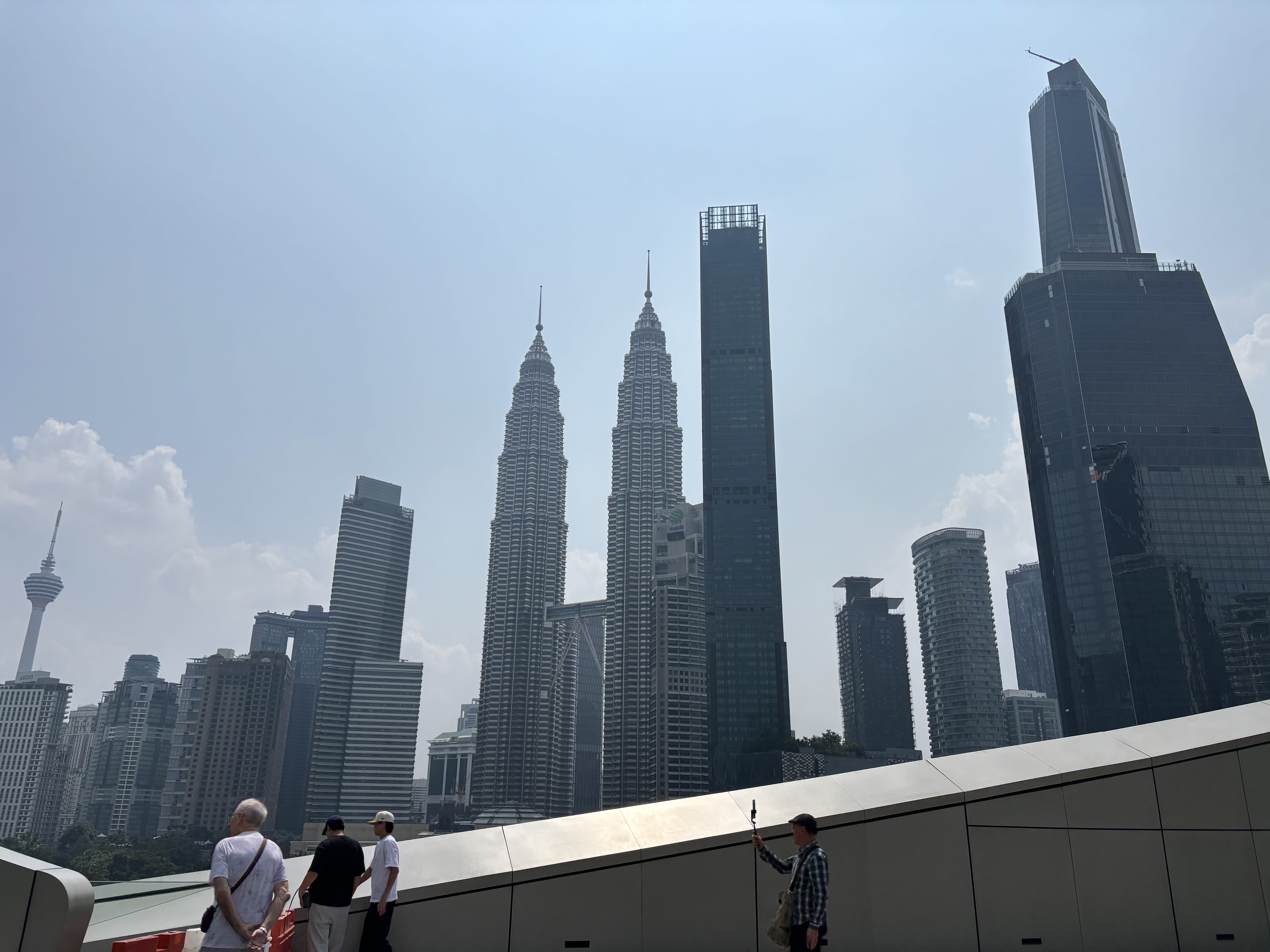
View of Kuala Lumpur's skyline from the mall's rooftop

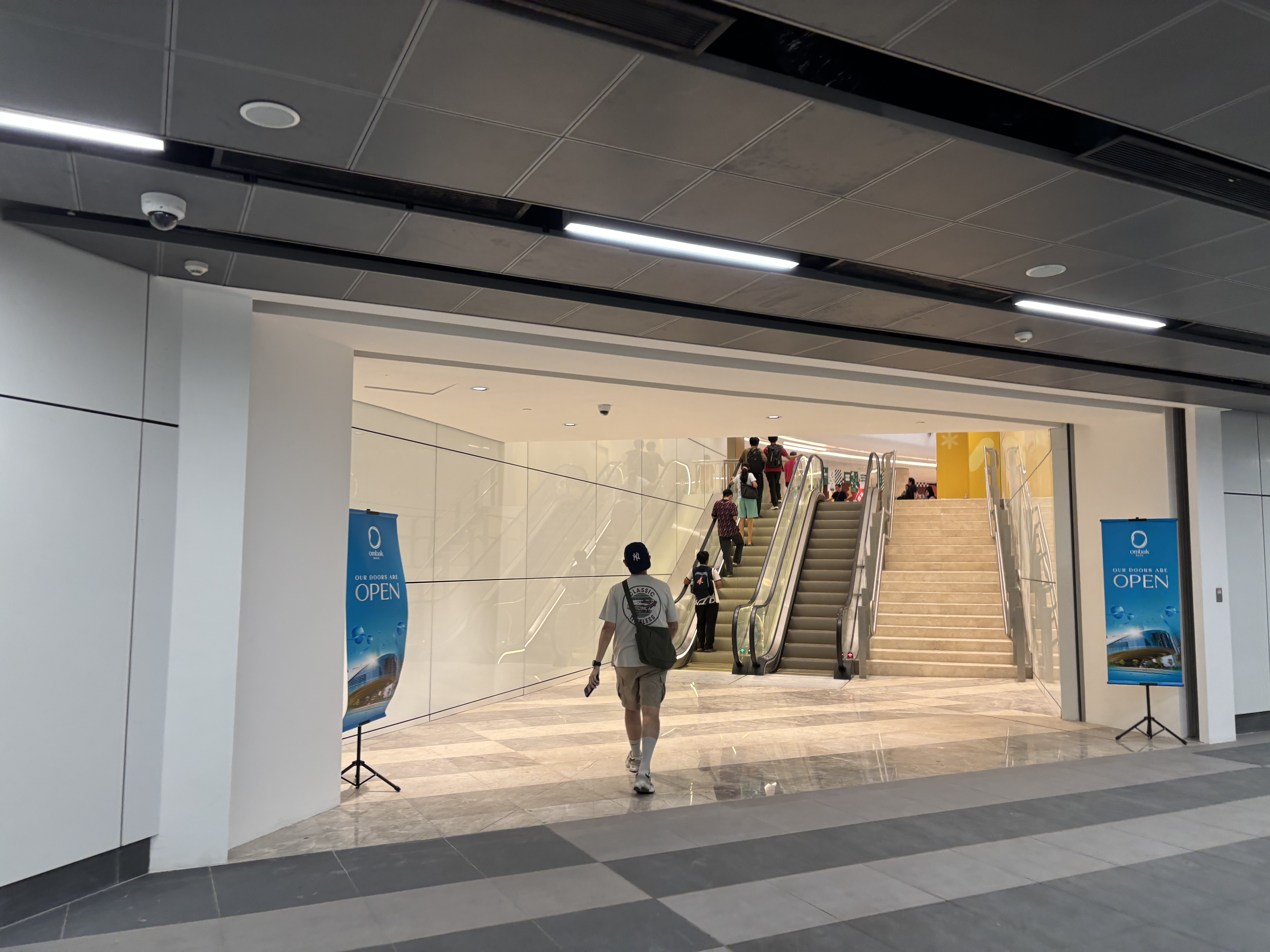
Entrance to Ombak KLCC from Exit C of Persiaran KLCC MRT station

== See also ==
- List of shopping malls in Malaysia
- Suria KLCC
- Kuala Lumpur City Centre
- Tower M
