= Persiaran KLCC MRT station =

Metro station in Kuala Lumpur, Malaysia

Coordinates: 3°9′24″N 101°43′2″E

PY21 Persiaran KLCC
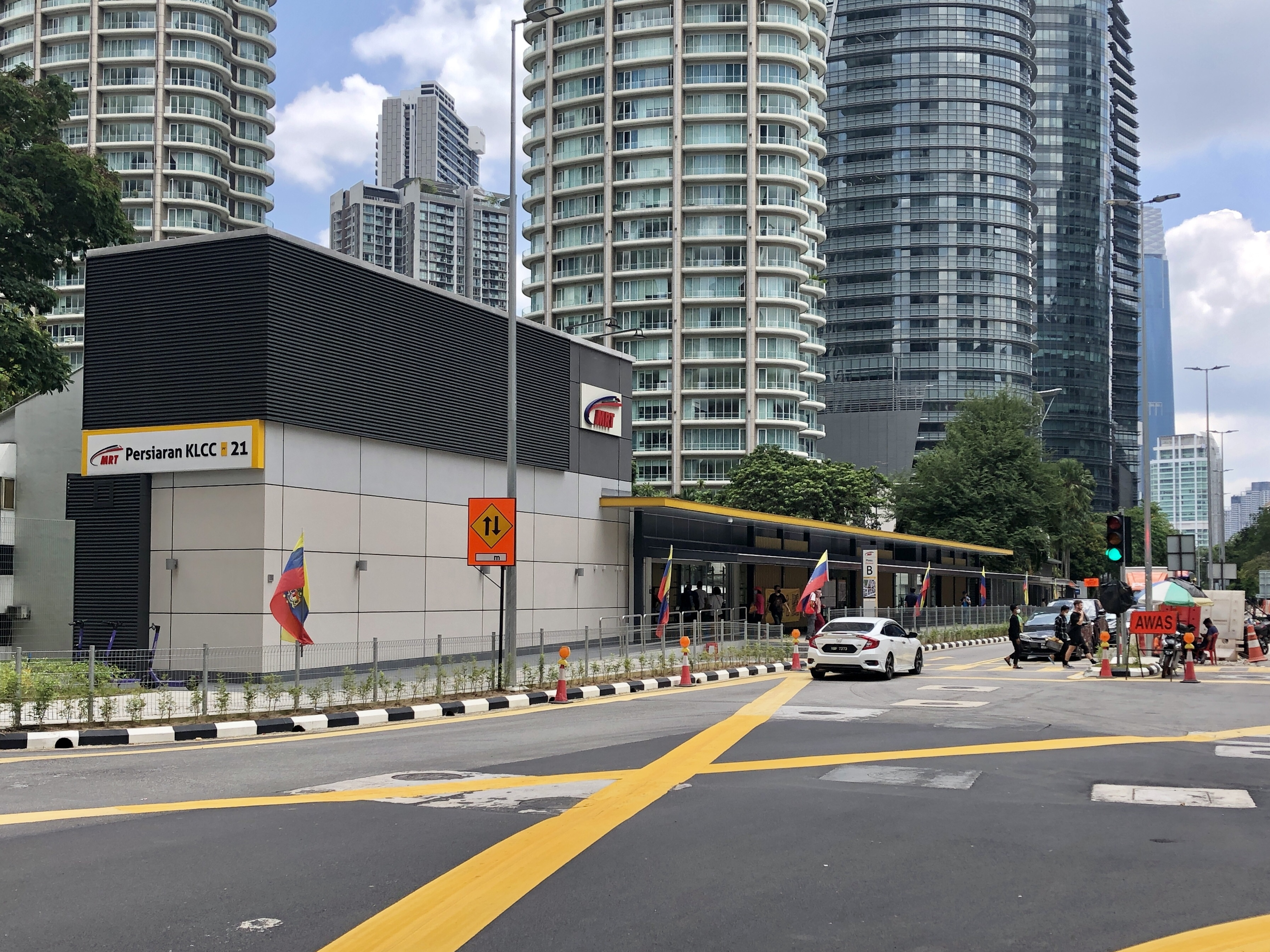
- Persiaran KLCC station

General information
- Other names: Malay: ڤرسيارن کي.ايل.سي.سي. (Jawi); Chinese: 城中城道; Tamil: பெர்சியாரான் கேஎல்சிசி
- Location: Jalan Binjai, Kuala Lumpur City Centre; 50450 Kuala Lumpur; Malaysia
- System: Rapid KL
- Owner: MRT Corp
- Operator: Rapid Rail
- Line: 12 Putrajaya Line
- Platforms: 2 stacked side platforms
- Tracks: 2

Construction
- Structure type: Underground
- Depth: 37.5 metres (123 ft)
- Parking: Not available
- Cycle facilities: Not available
- Accessible: Yes

Other information
- Status: Operational
- Station code: PY21

History
- Opened: 16 March 2023; 3 years ago

Services
| Preceding station | | Following station |
|---|---|---|
| Ampang Park towards Kwasa Damansara | Putrajaya Line | Conlay towards Putrajaya Sentral |
Location

The Persiaran KLCC MRT station is a mass rapid transit (MRT) underground station in the Kuala Lumpur City Centre (KLCC) subdistrict in Kuala Lumpur, Malaysia. It is one of the stations on the MRT Putrajaya Line.

== Station details ==
=== Location ===
The station is located on Persiaran KLCC on the site of a former multi-storey car park. It is near the As Syakirin Mosque, and is within 700m walking distance to KLCC Park, Suria KLCC and the KLCC LRT Station. The station is also close to The Troika and the headquarters of Federal Land Development Authority (FELDA).

=== Exits and entrances ===
Prior to 26 November 2023, the southern part of the concourse was closed except for emergency use.

There are a total of three entrances. Entrance B was initially the only entrance to the MRT station due to the construction work being conducted around the station at that time. On 26 November 2023, Entrance C was opened and also served as the drop-off location for the station.

Putrajaya Line station
| Entrance | Location | Destination | Picture |
| A | Concourse Level | Direct access to the retail mall Ombak KLCC via underground pedestrian link Ombak KLCC, Tower M, New Petronas Gallery | |
| B | East side of Persiaran KLCC | Jalan Binjai, Perdana Kuala Lumpur City Centre, Ilham Gallery, InterContinental Kuala Lumpur, Menara Binjai, The Troika Condo, Binjai Residency, As Syakirin Mosque, The Oval KL, Platinum Park, The Binjai On The Park condo, | |
| C | West side of Persiaran KLCC | Taxi and E-hailing layby, street level access, Ombak KLCC | |

== Connection with LRT Kelana Jaya Line ==
Despite its name, the MRT station is about 700 metres walking distance from Suria KLCC mall and the Petronas Twin Towers, which are directly served by the KLCC LRT station on the LRT Kelana Jaya Line, which is also underground. The MRT station is also just about a 350-meter walking distance from Ampang Park LRT station and the Ampang Park MRT station, both of which are underground as well.

According to reports, a bridge or a pedestrian walkway was planned, thus allowing pedestrian access between the MRT station and the LRT station, through the Suria KLCC mall.
