= Muid Latif =

Malaysian artist (1979–2020)

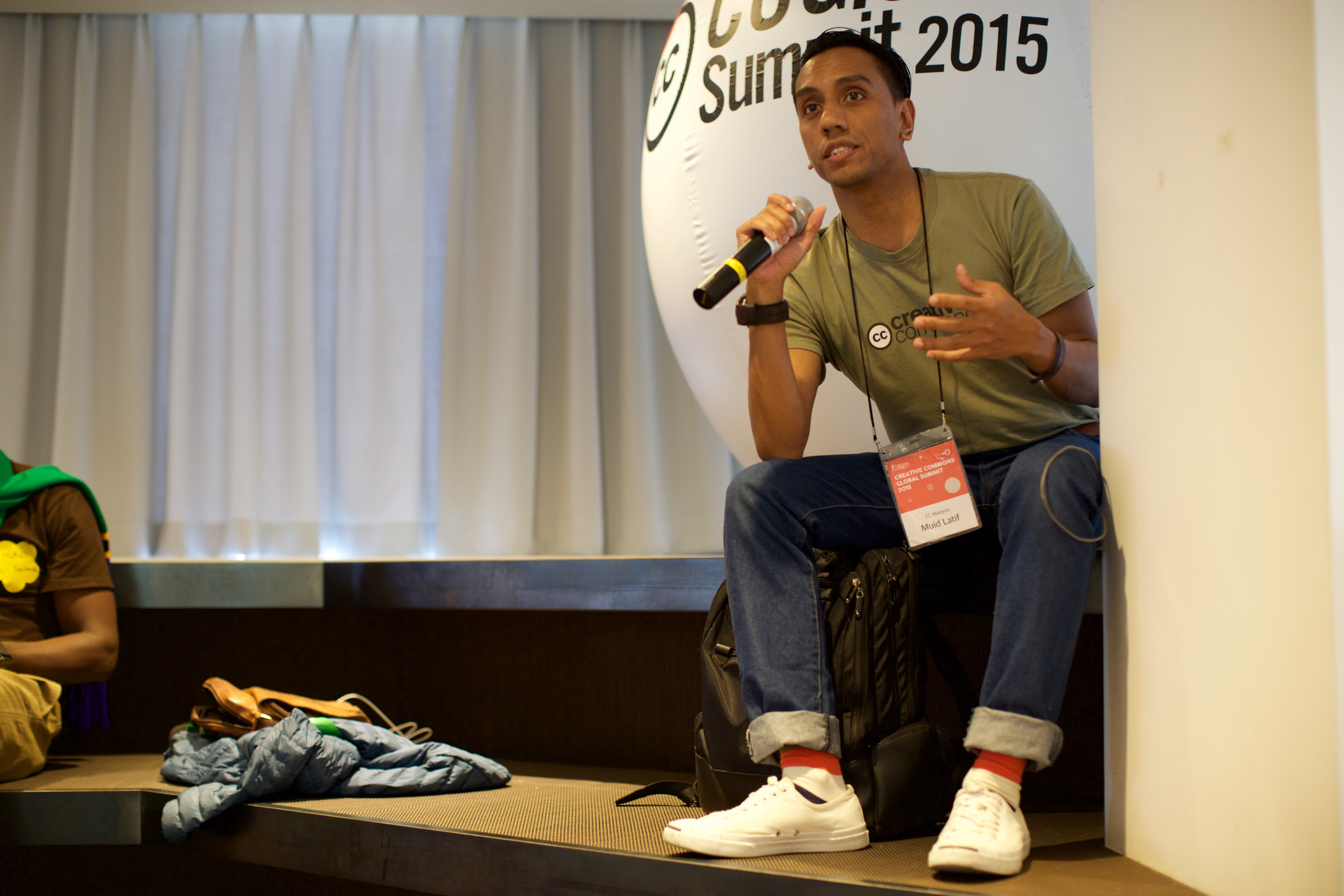
- Born: Abdul Muid Abdul Latif; 24 February 1979; George Town, Penang, Malaysia
- Died: 11 April 2020 (aged 41)
- Occupation(s): digital artist, web designer, design activist, graphic designer, poet
- Website: muidlatif.com

Abdul Muid bin Abdul Latif (24 February 1979 – 11 April 2020) was a Malaysian-based web designer, graphic designer and digital artist, who is known for promoting the cultural elements of the Southeast Asia from Batik and Songket into his commercial works and artworks.

Muid was the Project Lead for Creative Commons Malaysia who actively promote Free culture movement and open collaboration. Muid was one of the official Behance Ambassadors representing Malaysia and the author of 'Mekarnya Cinta Kata-kata dan Puisi' e-book, a part of initiative to help the Creative Commons movement in fostering Free content awareness and Going green campaign.

== Biography ==
After obtaining a bachelor's degree in fine arts from the University Technology Mara (UiTM) Shah Alam, Selangor, Malaysia in 2001, Muid worked at a few web agencies and design studios providing creative assistance for online campaigns, such as Maxis Hotlink, Petronas's Petrosains Discovery Centre, Toyota and Microsoft Singapore.

Muid was an active supporter of Creative Commons and he sat as one of the board members in Creative Commons Malaysia until 2008 and in 2011 onwards, he was appointed as Project Lead of Creative Commons Malaysia to promote the free culture movement and translation of latest version of Creative Commons licenses to Malay language. Muid founded Digital Malaya Project (DMP), a collective art group that supports Malaysia's creative multimedia industry in 2001. Digital Malaya Project has been participating in art exhibitions from Malaysia to Singapore, Jakarta, Bangkok, Japan and Germany, and has been involved in pro-bono projects and campaigns with the Malaysian AIDS Council, Yahoo! Flickr Malaysia group, government bodies and NGO such as Perdana Leadership Foundation. Digital Malaya Project has been supporting the Malaysian Art and Design scene for almost ten years and was appointed by Adobe (ADAA committee members) to support the Adobe Design Achievement Awards 2008 as the official media supporter. Digital Malaya Project was nominated as 'Best Selection' in the WebCuts 2006 held in Germany and was a finalist for the MSC Malaysia APICTA 2002 Best Student Project Awards. Muid was involved as an ambassador to Kuala Lumpur Design Week (KLDW) 2009 and 2010 and also showcased collaborations with Southeast Asian Designers such as Drew Europeo, Tony Ariawan, Amenth, Firdaus Mahadi and many others. Muid was involved as one of the final judges for 6th and 8th Philippines Web Awards alongside Joshua Davis, Adhemas Batista and Carole Guevin and MSC Malaysia Kre8tif! Industry Awards judges for Digital Art Category in 2009 and 2010. Continuing his success in judging international awards and competitions, Muid was certified twice in 2012 and 2013 by the Ministry of Human Resources (Malaysia) for his contributions in mapping the curriculum and syllabus in 3d animation for the Malaysian Skills Certification System. and Malaysia Website Awards 2016 (MWA2016).

As an ASEF (Asia-Europe Foundation) alumnus, Muid presented his paperwork on Malaysia's New media Practice and Policy development at the Mini Summit on New Media Arts Policy and Practice July 2008 in conjunction with International Symposium of Electronic Art (ISEA2008), Singapore, and also presented "How Does CC (Creative Commons) Works For Photographers" at the National Art Gallery, Kuala Lumpur in conjunction with ASEF Emerging Photographer's Forum 2009.

In October 2010, Muid became the first digital artist in Malaysia to perform a live digital art show (using Adobe Photoshop) together with the Malaysian Philharmonic Orchestra under the talented conductor, Harish Shankar, during the KLCC Art festival

'Malaysian Artist for Unity', a pro-bono project by Malaysians created to gain more awareness for people to work together, embracing unity without prejudice and discrimination due to racial tension and racism that is happening around the world. 'Here in My Home' was Muid's first commercial involvement as a cast and crew. This project was produced by Pete Teo and directed by Yasmin Ahmad and film director, Ho Yuhang. Muid had also to contribute to Malaysian Book of Records as an illustrator for the Longest Comic Banner in Asia dated March 2008, located in PTWC, Kuala Lumpur during the Comic Fiesta and was a creative consultant to Multimedia Development Corporation (MDeC) after working on Malaysia first 3D animated series called Saladin, The Animated Series which was nominated in the International Emmy Awards 2011. Muid worked as an independent new media specialist and developer, giving talks for local art and design institutions, volunteering for charity for NGO and handling various creative works and campaigns from creative writing, web designs and multimedia development including Puteri Gunung Ledang: The Musical Season 3, cover art, creative campaigns for local and international recording artists. Muid was also a member of Graphic Design Association of Malaysia (wREGA); wREGA which is the only official authorised graphic design association in Malaysia (affiliated with ICOGRADA since 2001) and is also a non-profit, non-political organisation with the objective of encouraging professional practice and promoting design excellence in the art and science of visual communication in commerce, trade, industry and education, both locally and internationally. From 2011 onwards, Muid has extensively created a series of space art and exhibited in major art galleries like Petronas Gallery and Penang State Art Gallery in conjunction with 'Young Malaysian Artists II' exhibition.

== Influence ==
Muid was the Third generation of Digital Artist in Malaysia along with other successful Digital Artists such as Aadi Salman (who works on Graphic novel 'Silent Hill'), Milx (who works with Marvel Comics of Silver Surfer, Fytullah Hamzah (Kromosom), Tan Jin Ho, and others. A few of Muid's digital artworks like 'Lovely Disturbia' are currently in the 2012 permanent collection of Penang State Art Gallery located in George Town, Penang and Bank Negara Malaysia Museum and Art Gallery Collection in 2015 & 2016.

Muid's digital art on canvas printing called ‘Better Together’, produced in conjunction with the World AIDS Day 2015 celebration organised by Kakiseni and ONE Condom Malaysia was auctioned for RM20,000.

== Exhibitions ==
Selected group exhibition and showcase:

- 2017 - 'Nature Nurtured' (Group Exhibition), Bank Negara Malaysia Museum and Art Gallery, Sasana Kijang, Kuala Lumpur, Malaysia
- 2016 - Flora and Fauna at ACC (Group Exhibition) in conjunction with Merdeka 59 Exhibition, Art Gallery, Bank Negara Malaysia Museum and Art Gallery, Sasana Kijang, Kuala Lumpur, Malaysia
- 2016 - Flora and Fauna at ACC (Group Exhibition), Bank Negara Malaysia Headquarters, Kuala Lumpur, Malaysia
- 2016 - Flora and Fauna at ACC (Group Exhibition), Bank Negara Malaysia, Batu Tiga, Shah Alam, Selangor, Malaysia
- 2015 - 'Star Wars Art Force Salute' Group Exhibition, Star Wars Fan Festival Taiwan, SYNTREND Space Mall, Taipei, Taiwan
- 2015 - 'Designber Fest' Group Exhibition, Pier 2, Kaohsiung, Taiwan
- 2014 - B0dy_m0vement showcase with Perezoldskool, Pause Fest 2014, Federation Square Big Screen, Melbourne, Australia
- 2014 - Young Malaysian Artists II Exhibition, Penang State Art Gallery, Penang, Malaysia
- 2013 - Creative Cities (Kaohsiung Design Festival), Pier 2 Art Centre, Kaohsiung, Taiwan
- 2013 - Young Malaysian Artists II, Petronas Gallery, KLCC, Kuala Lumpur, Malaysia
- 2013 - Digital Malaya Project Group Exhibition, Future + Traditions, Digital Photography and Video Installation, Art Row, PUBLIKA Solaris Dutamas, Kuala Lumpur, Malaysia
- 2012 - Beautiful Junk Exhibition, In Studio @ Straits, Armenian Street, George Town, Penang, Malaysia
- 2012 - Behance Malaysia 2nd Group Exhibition (Akar & Kukubesi Vol.II), Galeri Shah Alam, Shah Alam, Selangor, Malaysia
- 2011 - INSIGHT Asia Creative Culture Exhibition, Red Gallery, East London, London, United Kingdom
- 2011 - Behance Malaysia 1st Group Exhibition, PUBLIKA Solaris Dutamas, Kuala Lumpur, Malaysia
- 2011 - AKAR & KUKUBESI Group Exhibition, Galeri Shah Alam, Selangor, Malaysia
- 2010 - INSIGHT, Contemporary Malaysian Designers Exhibition, Centre for Creative Communications (CCC), Shizuoka, Japan
- 2010 - Live Digital Art Performance with Malaysian Philharmonic Orchestra, Petronas Philharmonic Hall KLCC, Kuala Lumpur, Malaysia
- 2010 - Digitization, In Conjunction with KL Design Week 2010 (NOVA), Petronas Gallery, Suria KLCC, Kuala Lumpur, Malaysia
- 2009 - Digitization, Digital Art Exhibition, Siam Paragon, Bangkok, Thailand
- 2009 - Young Tiger Showcase, Kuala Lumpur Design Week 2009, CapSquare Mall, Kuala Lumpur, Malaysia
- 2008 - UOX Play, Sg. Wang Plaza Rooftop, Kuala Lumpur, Malaysia
- 2008 - Miss Hua Journey to Nanyang Exhibition, Han Chiang College, Penang, Malaysia
- 2008 - Digital Malaya Project Group Exhibition III, Urbanscapes, Kuala Lumpur Performing Arts Centre (KLPAC), Kuala Lumpur, Malaysia
- 2008 - Get Moovable Moving Art Exhibition, Palate Palette Restaurant and Bar, Kuala Lumpur, Malaysia
- 2007 - Let Arts Move You (LAMU) Festival, Kuala Lumpur Sentral, Kuala Lumpur, Malaysia
- 2006 - DIGI-Starbucks Music Series exhibition, Starbucks, Centrepoint, Bandar Utama, Petaling Jaya, Selangor, Malaysia
- 2006 - Kingdom of Rebel, Digital Malaya Project Video Screening, Pelita Hati Gallery, Bangsar, Kuala Lumpur, Malaysia
- 2006 - Massive Territory Group Exhibition, National Gallery of Indonesia, Jakarta, Indonesia
- 2006 - Poster Show, Wondermilk Uptown, Petaling Jaya, Selangor, Malaysia
- 2006 - EX2, Digital Art Exhibition, Galleriiizu, Wisma UOA, Jalan Pinang, Kuala Lumpur, Malaysia
- 2005 - aRtY ParTy Video Showcase, Galleriiizu, Wisma UOA, Jalan Pinang, Kuala Lumpur, Malaysia
- 2005 - ‘7’, An Exhibition, Galleriiizu, Wisma UOA, Jalan Pinang, Kuala Lumpur, Malaysia
- 2005 - Open House, Gema Rimba Gallery, Bukit Tunku, Kuala Lumpur, Malaysia
- 2005 - Digital Malaya Project Group Exhibition II, NotThatBalai Art Festival, Taman Seputeh, Kuala Lumpur, Malaysia
- 2005 - Beautiful Junk Exhibition, Dewan Sri Pinang, George Town, Penang, Malaysia
- 2004 - Digital Malaya Project Group Exhibition, NotThatBalai Festival, Taman Seputeh, Kuala Lumpur, Malaysia
- 2004 - Undiscovered Territory, Berjaya Time Square, Kuala Lumpur, Malaysia
- 2004 - Digital Malaya Group Exhibition, SAYA Art Festival, PSC Perdana Shopping Centre, Damansara Perdana, Petaling Jaya, Selangor, Malaysia
- 2004 - Urbanscapes, Kuala Lumpur Sentral (Open Space), Kuala Lumpur, Malaysia
- 2003 - Merdeka Young Malaysian Designer Group Exhibition, INTEC College Gallery, Jalan Klang Lama, Kuala Lumpur, Malaysia
- 2002 - Digital Malaya Project showcase @ MSC APICTA, Sri Pentas, TV3, Petaling Jaya, Selangor, Malaysia
- 2001 - Remixed Exhibition, Final Degree Showcase, Faculty of Art & Design, University Technology MARA (UiTM), Shah Alam, Selangor, Malaysia
- 1997–98 - Art Market, Foyer FSSR, University Technology MARA (UiTM), Shah Alam, Selangor, Malaysia
