= Petrosains =

- Established: 25 March 1999; 27 years ago
- Location: Suria KLCC, Kuala Lumpur City Centre, 50088 Kuala Lumpur, Malaysia
- Coordinates: 3.1578987°N 101.7097923°E
- Type: Science museum
- Accreditation: Asia Pacific Network of Science & Technology Centres (ASPAC)
- CEO: Ezarisma Azni Mohamad
- Owner: Petronas
- Website: petrosains.com.my

Petrosains, also known as Petrosains, The Discovery Centre is a Malaysian science and technology museum located in the heart of Kuala Lumpur within Suria KLCC, Petronas Twin Towers. Petrosains was a brainchild of 4th Prime Minister Mahathir Mohamad and established on 25 March 1999. It is owned and operated by Petrosains Sdn. Bhd., a wholly owned subsidiary of the Malaysian oil and gas conglomerate Petronas. Tengku Nasariah Tengku Syed Ibrahim is the CEO of Petrosains until 2018. The current CEO is Ezarisma Azni Mohamad.

Petrosains also a principal organizer of the annual Petrosains Science Festival since its inauguration in 2013.

Since its establishment in 1999, Petrosains' primary language has been always English, which was used in all of its daily operations and official matters instead of Malay. However, most programs held in Petrosains are still conducted in Malay.

== Galleries ==
Among galleries available at Petrosains are:

- Dark Ride
- Space
- Speed
- Molecule Nano World
- 3D Theatre

== Operating Hours ==
Weekdays: 9:30 a.m. - 5:30 p.m. (Last admission 4:00 p.m.)

Weekdays and Public Holidays: 9:30 a.m. - 6:30 p.m. (Last admission 5:00 p.m.)

Closed On The First Monday of The Month

== Admission Rates ==
Ticket Category	MyKad		Non-MyKad	
Ticket Category	Weekdays	Weekends	Weekdays	Weekends
Infant	Free Admission		Free Admission	
Child	MYR 10	MYR 12	MYR 20	MYR 25
Adult	MYR 22	MYR 25	MYR 35	MYR 40
Senior Citizen	MYR 10	MYR 12	MYR 20	MYR 25

=== Optional Admissions ===
Energy Capsule: MYR 9 per pax

Maker Studio: MYR 5 per pax

(Tickets can be purchased physically or online through https://eticket.petrosains.com.my/)

== Gallery ==
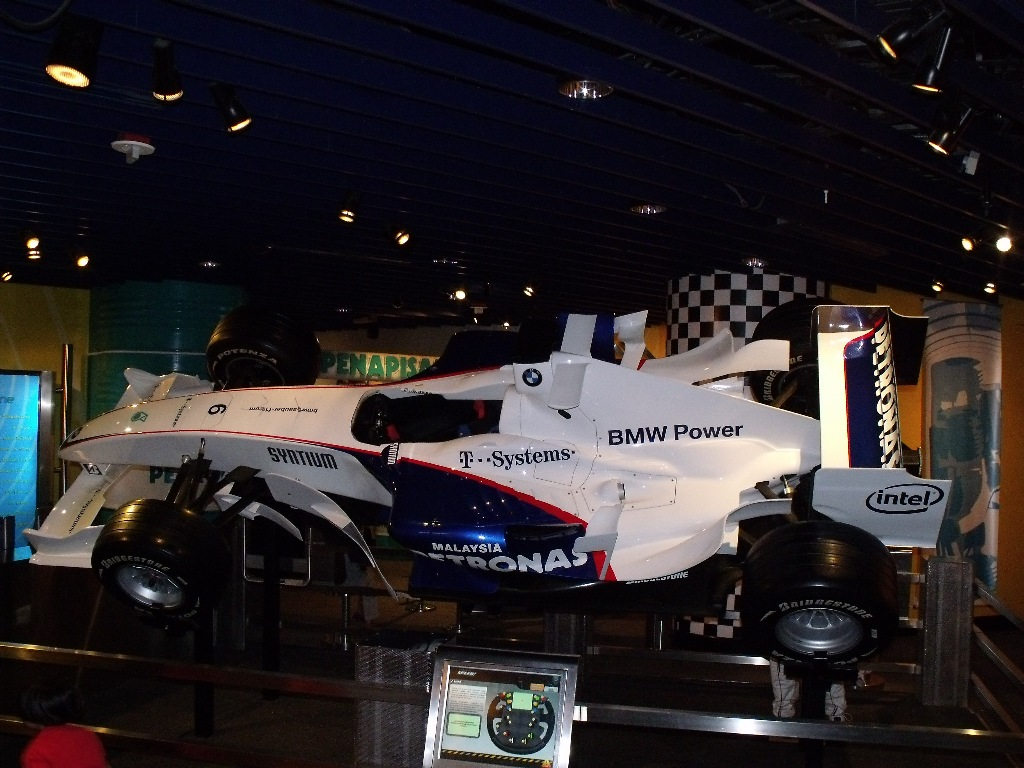
Formula One car at Petrosains

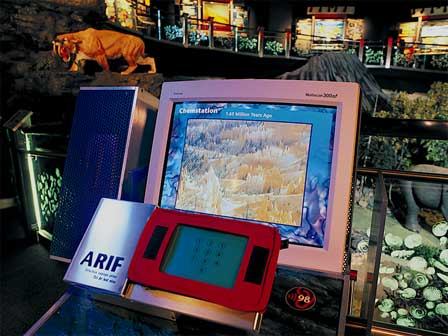
Petrosains InteractStation

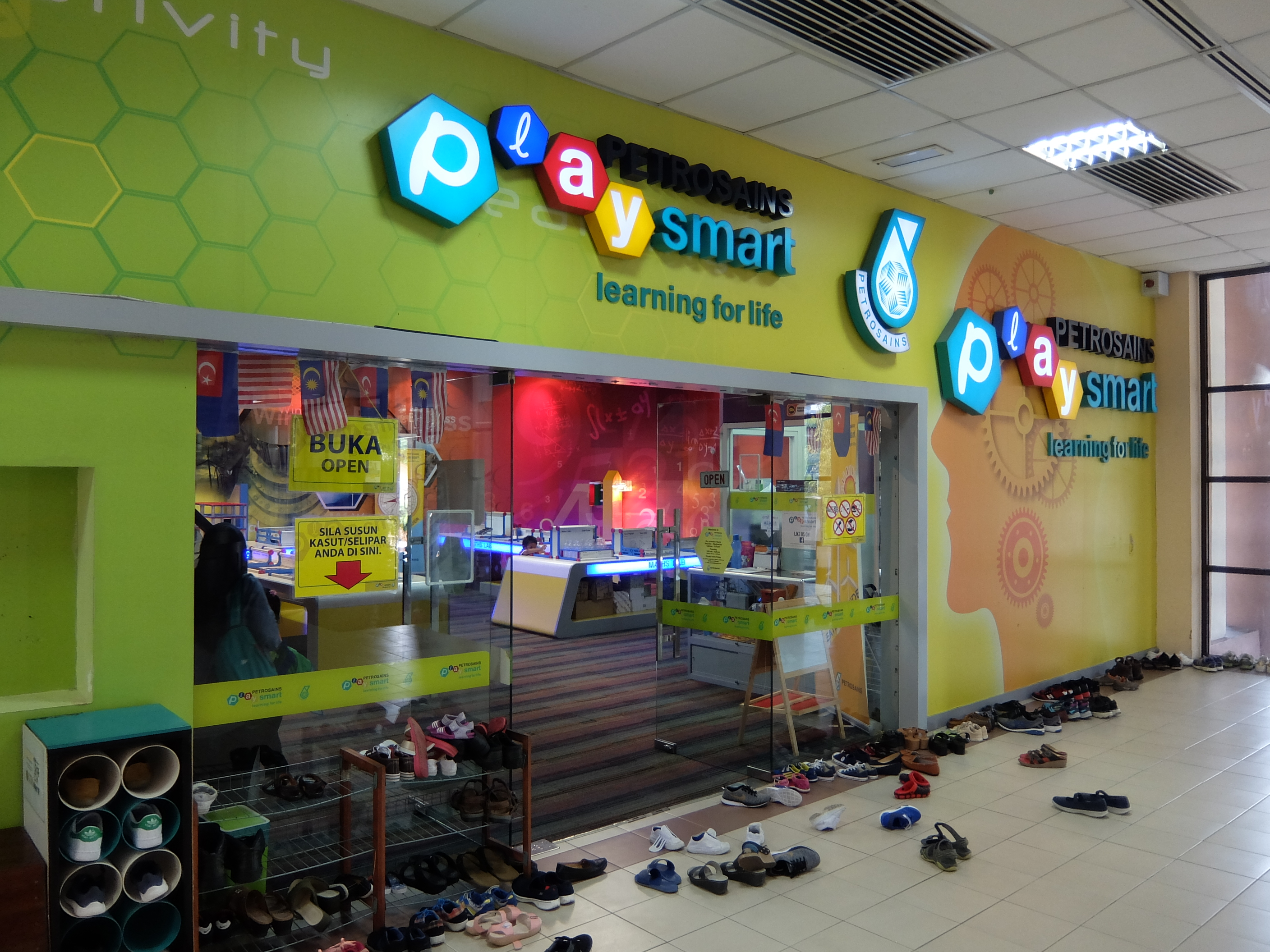
Petrosains PlaySmart

== See also ==
- Petronas
- Petronas Gallery
