= Tower M =

Proposed skyscraper in Kuala Lumpur, Malaysia

- Artist's impression of Tower M
- Interactive map of the Tower M area
- Former names: KLCC East Gate Tower

General information
- Status: Proposed
- Type: Office
- Architectural style: Neo-futurism
- Location: Kuala Lumpur City Centre, Kuala Lumpur, Malaysia
- Coordinates: 3°09′24″N 101°43′04″E
- Estimated completion: 2045 to 2050
- Owner: KLCC Property Holdings Berhad (KLCCP)

Height
- Height: 700 m (2,297 ft)

Technical details
- Floor count: 145

Design and construction
- Architects: Kohn Pedersen Fox Associates; NRY Architects
- Developer: KLCC Property Holdings Bhd
- Main contractor: Samsung C&T; BAUER Group

Tower M, formerly known as the KLCC East Gate Tower, is a proposed megatall skyscraper project in Kuala Lumpur, Malaysia, situated within the Kuala Lumpur City Centre (KLCC). KLCC Property Holdings Berhad, which was also responsible for the development of the Petronas Twin Towers, is currently developing the building as part of the revised KLCC Development Master Plan 1995. The masterplan was reviewed in 2012 to enhance the development potential of the development's remaining undeveloped parcels.

The Tower M precinct will consist of three office towers on top of the Ombak KLCC retail podium and come upon 1.6 ha (4 acres) of land named Lots L, L1 and M next to Persiaran KLCC MRT station, previously KLCC East on the Putrajaya Line. It is planned to be 700 m (2,297 ft) high with 145 storeys. In July 2018, KLCCH which is the landowner stated that there are no plans in the short to medium term to construct the office towers. If demand ever arises, planning is unlikely to start before the year 2035, with completion around 2045 to 2050.

== Progress ==
The piling and foundation works for the tower started in early 2019. Foundation works of the tower goes 130 to 150 m (430 to 490 ft) deep into the ground at the base of the tower. Works of it had to be done along with the construction of the MRT underground station due to the strict requirement of movements on the structure.

The first phase of the Tower M precinct is a 6-storey retail podium building called Ombak KLCC and a gallery space for Petronas under the masterplan. The mall would be integrated with the Persiaran KLCC MRT station served by the Putrajaya line which was completed in early 2023. The structure of the building is designed in the form of cantilever and atypical facade. The construction of its retail component commenced in July 2019 while part of Phase 1 is being developed by Samsung C&T (KL) Sdn Bhd, a subsidiary of the Samsung C&T Corp.

== Transportation ==
The tower and its retail mall Ombak KLCC are served by the PY21 Persiaran KLCC MRT station which is located underneath Jalan Binjai. The station is not connected to any interchange.

== Gallery ==
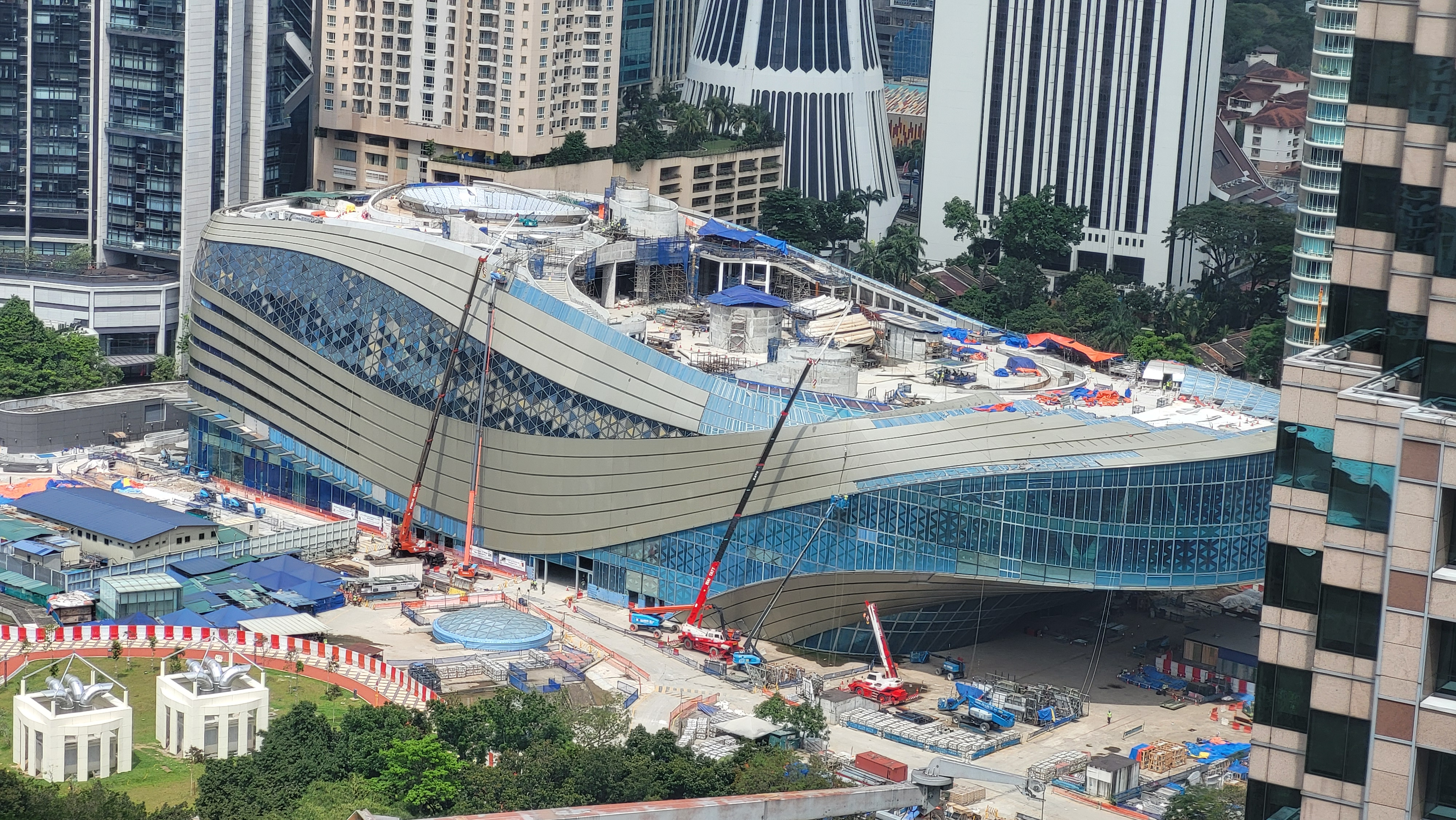
Ombak KLCC in 2025

== See also ==
- List of tallest buildings
- List of tallest buildings in Malaysia
- List of tallest buildings in Kuala Lumpur
- Merdeka PNB 118
- The Exchange 106
- Petronas Towers
