= KLCC Park =

Park in Kuala Lumpur City Centre, Malaysia

KLCC Park Taman KLCC
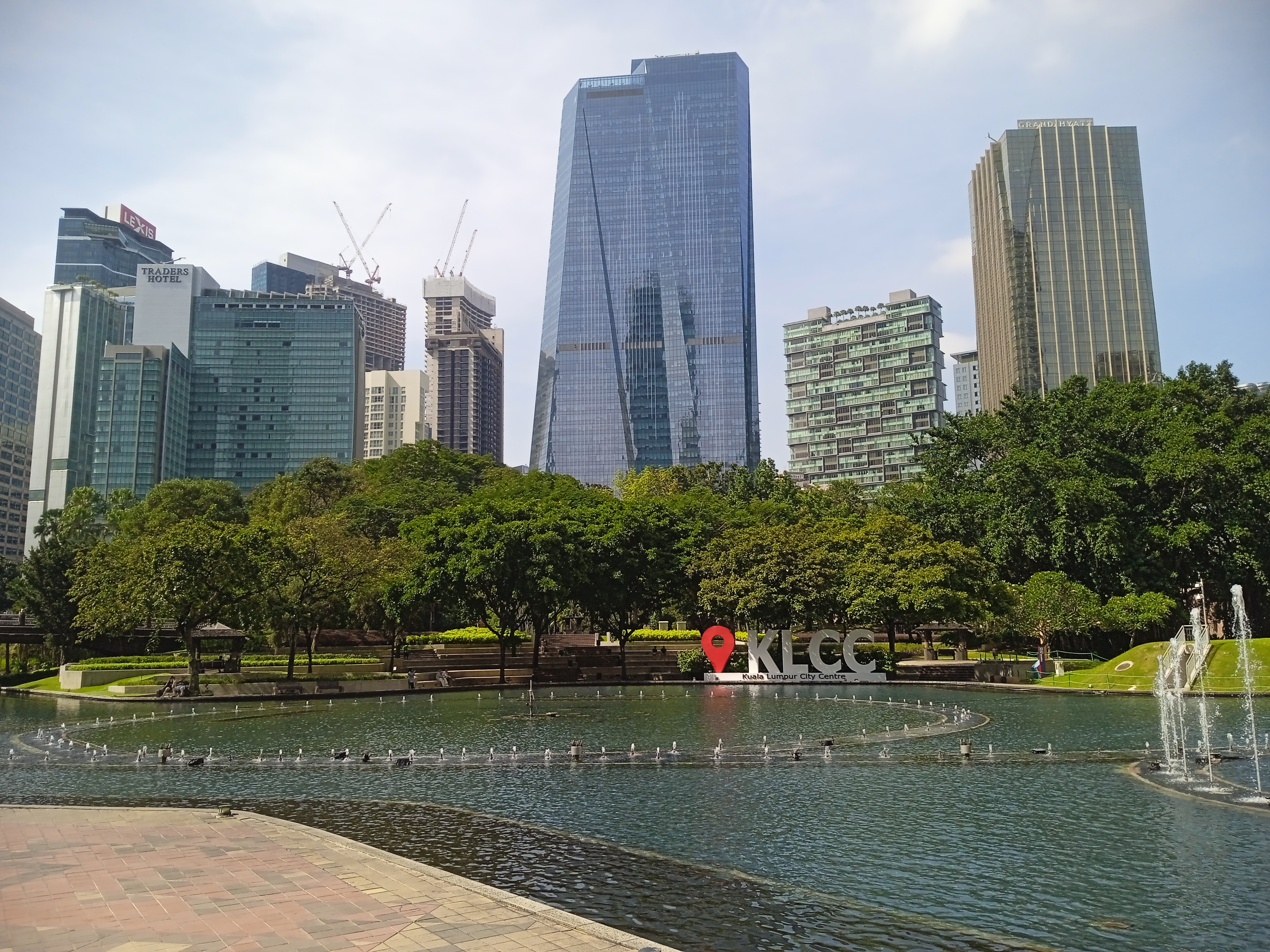
- View of Lake Symphony at KLCC Park
- Interactive map of KLCC Park; Taman KLCC
- Type: public park
- Location: Kuala Lumpur City Centre, Kuala Lumpur, Malaysia
- Coordinates: 3.155647°N 101.714997°E
- Area: 50 acres (20 ha)
- Created: Mid-1996
- Operator: KLCC Properties
- Status: Open all year
- Public transit: KJ10 KLCC LRT station PY21 Persiaran KLCC MRT station

The KLCC Park (Taman KLCC) is an urban park in Kuala Lumpur City Centre, Kuala Lumpur, Malaysia. The park has been designed to provide greenery to the Petronas Twin Towers and to the areas surrounding it.

== Design ==
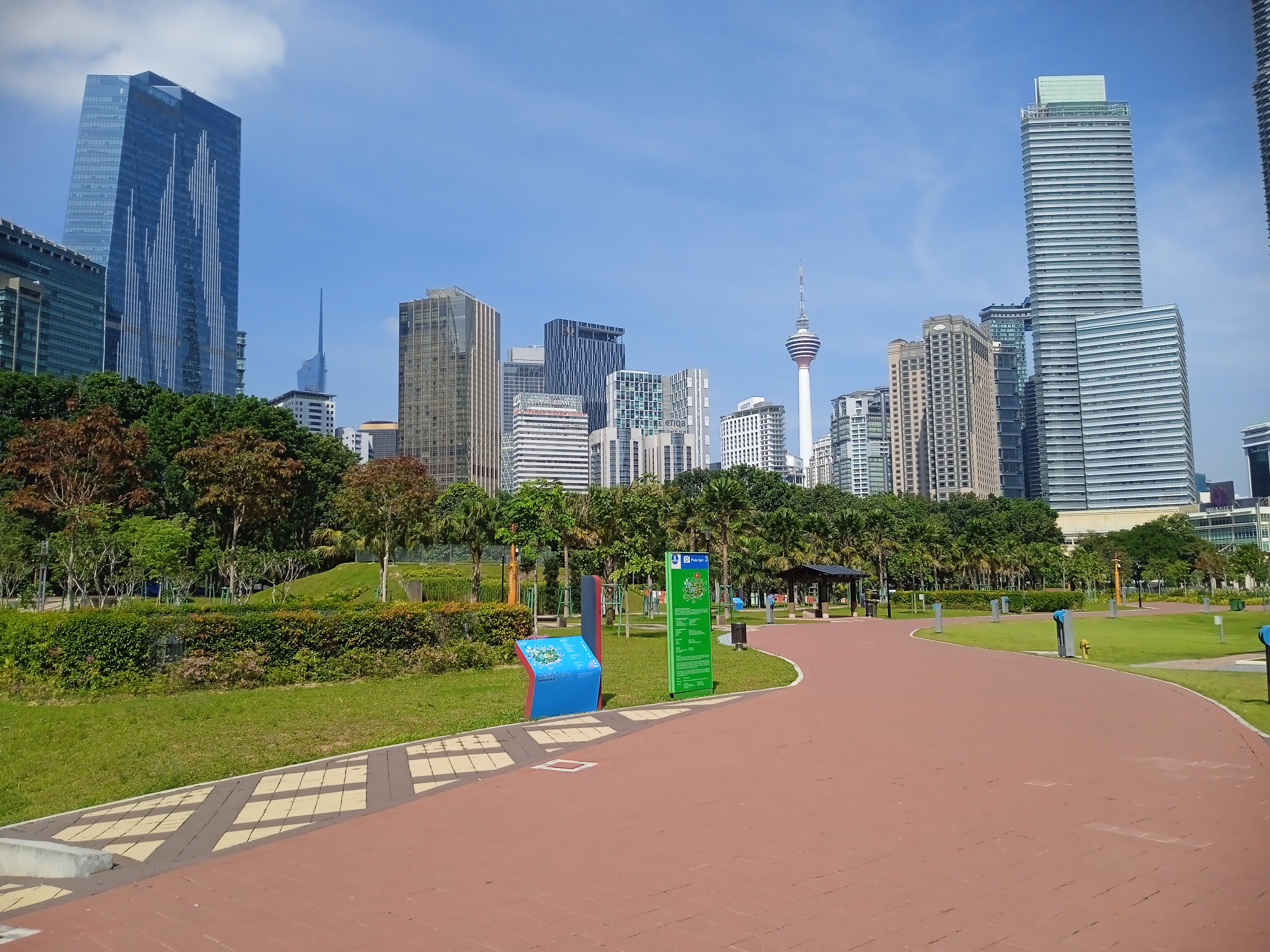
New walking pathway after refurbishment work of KLCC Park

The park was designed by Roberto Burle Marx. It is said that it was the last work undertaken by the Brazilian architect. When the park was designed, the aim was to "leave the world a little more sensitive and a little more educated to the importance of nature".

The park was designed to showcase a heritage of tropical greenery by integrating man's creation with nature. The park itself contrasts as a calm environment in the midst of the hustle and bustle of the city. The park features many combinations of man-made design such as cements, water features and also natural features such as trees, shrubs, stones and wood. Elements of shape and topography were created to give an illusion of space. The combination of trees, shrubs and sculptures were arranged to provide color and form to the park.

Conservation and bio-diversity was a major influence in the creation of the park. 23 of the mature and rarer specimens were saved from the old Selangor Turf Club and transplanted into the park grounds. 1900 indigenous trees and 66 species of palms were planted in the park to promote bio-diversity. The trees were deliberately selected to attract local and migratory birds.

A man made lake was built in the middle of the park with a 280 meter high water fountain, directly in front of Suria KLCC mall and Petronas Twin Towers towards the middle of the park. A 4.3 meter elevated bridge that cut across the lake provides a vantage view of the park and the twin towers.

== Features ==
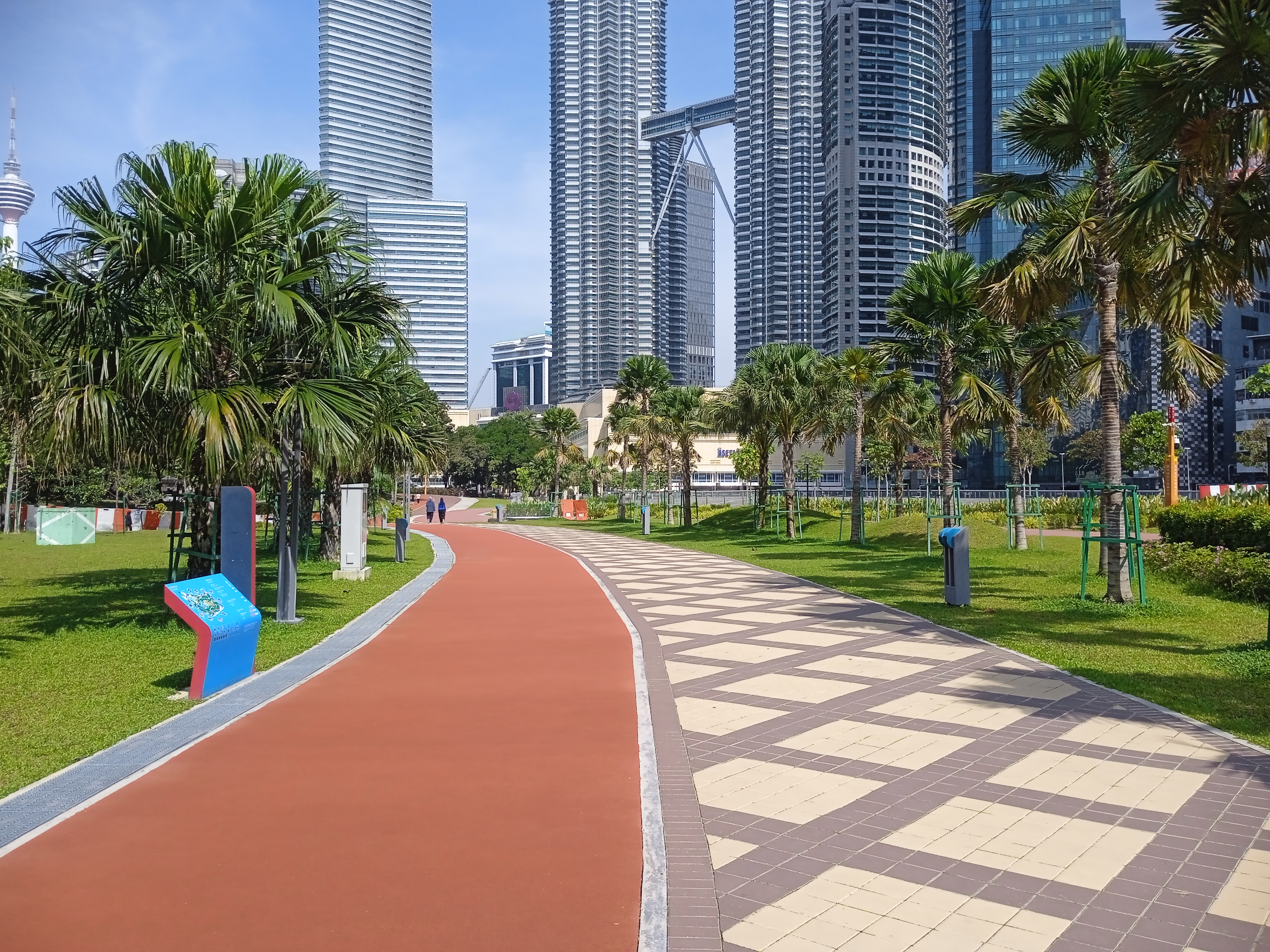
Jogging track at the park, looking to west

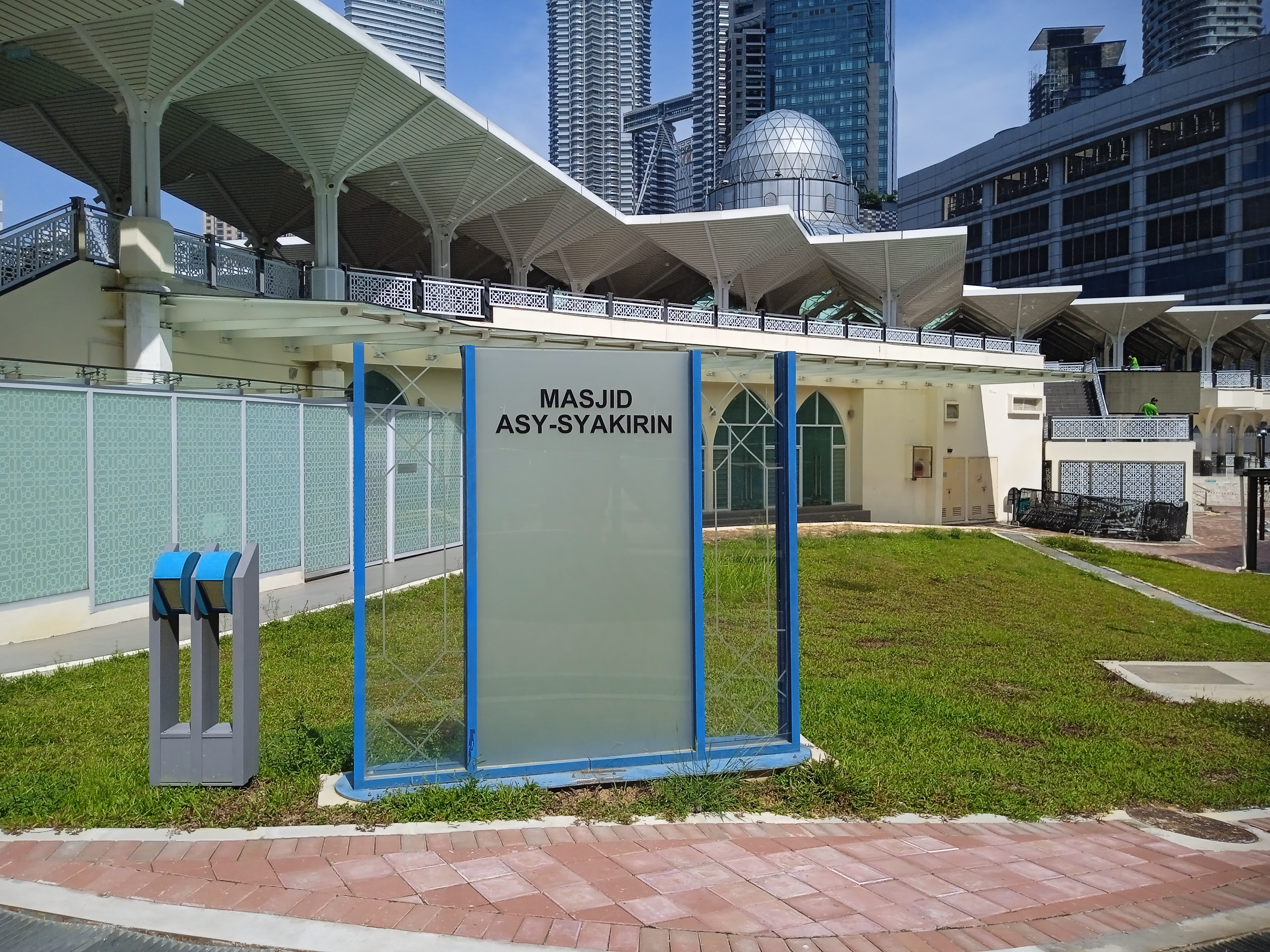
As Syakirin Mosque

=== Lake Symphony ===
Lake Symphony (Malay: Tasik Simfoni) is a 10,000 square meter man made lake with water fountains. The main fountain can shoot water up to a height of 280 metres. At night, there are lights, musics and fountains daily.

=== Jogging Track and Footpath ===
A 1.3 km. long jogging track is covered with EPDM, a special rubberised material for comfort and safety. Rest areas are provided along interconnecting footpaths and numbered on the local map.

=== Ornamental Water Features ===
Various waterfalls, fountains, cascade and reflecting pools are scattered around the park.

=== Children Playground ===
A children's playground with a public pool is located on the west side of the park.

=== Mosque ===
KLCC Park features the As Syakirin Mosque (Malay: Masjid Asy-Syakirin).

== Gallery ==
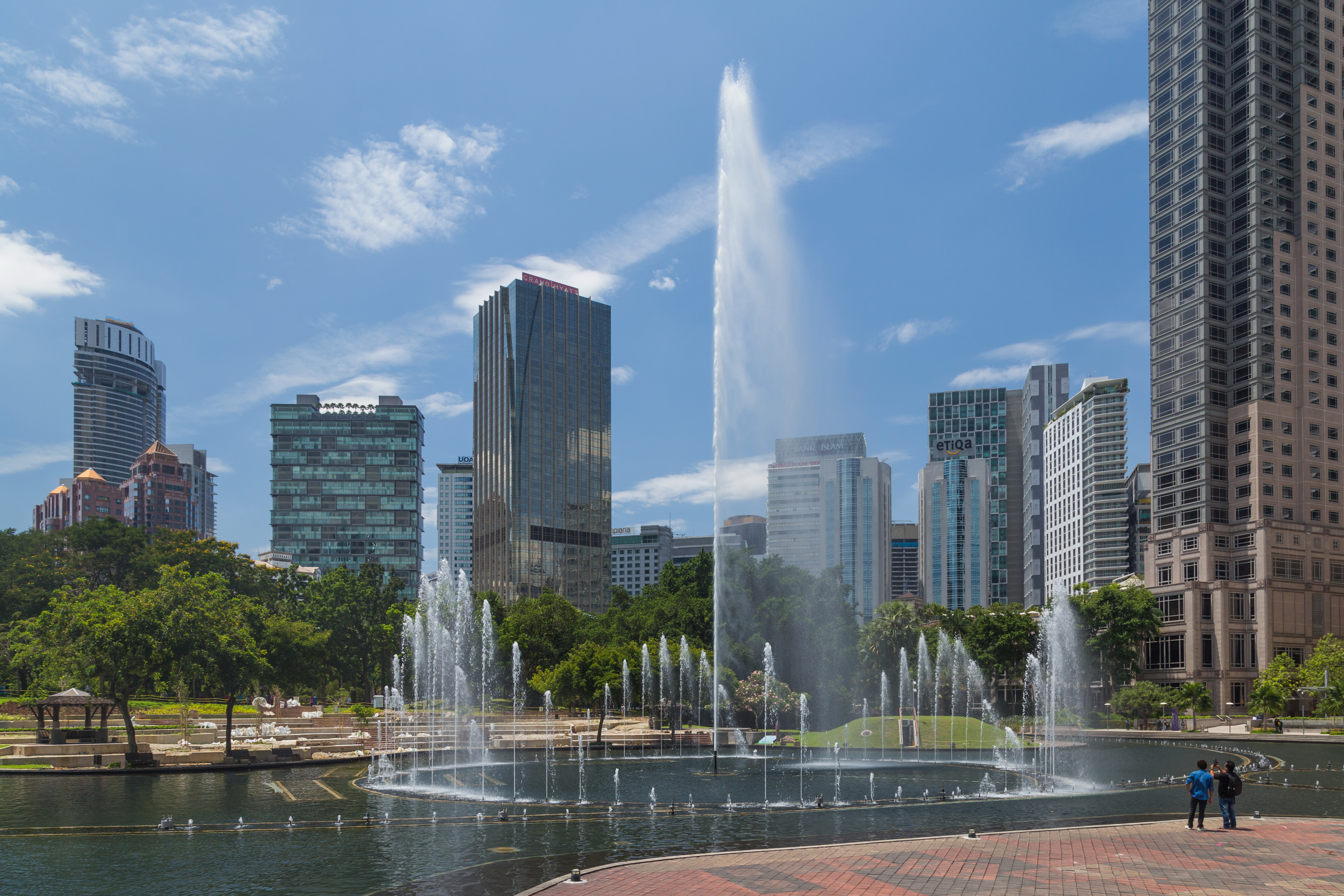
Water fountain on Symphony Lake

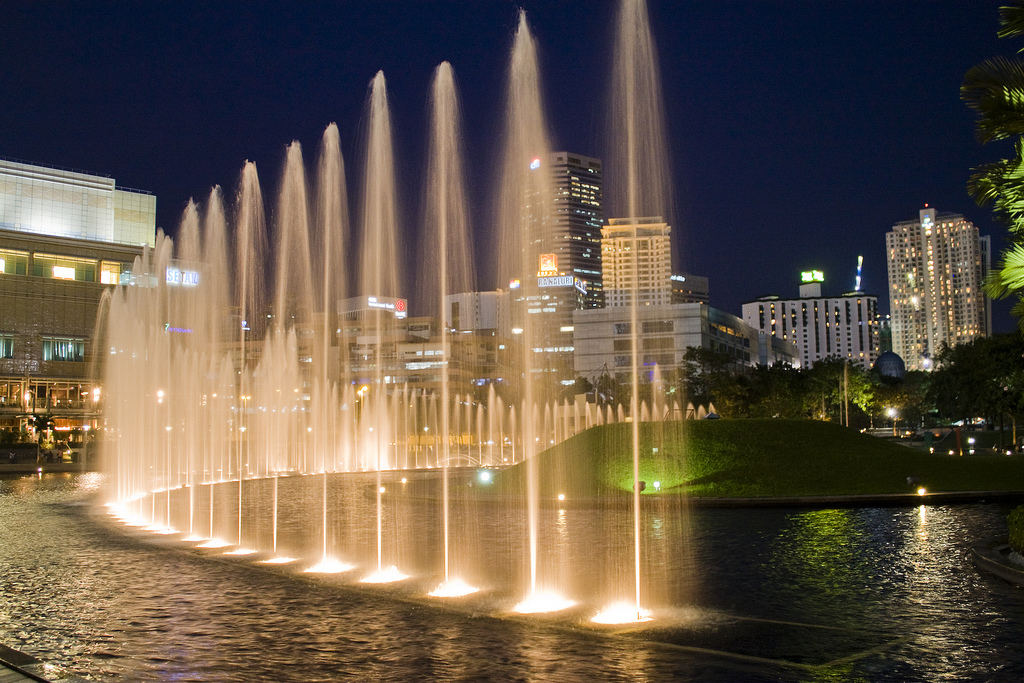
The water feature at night

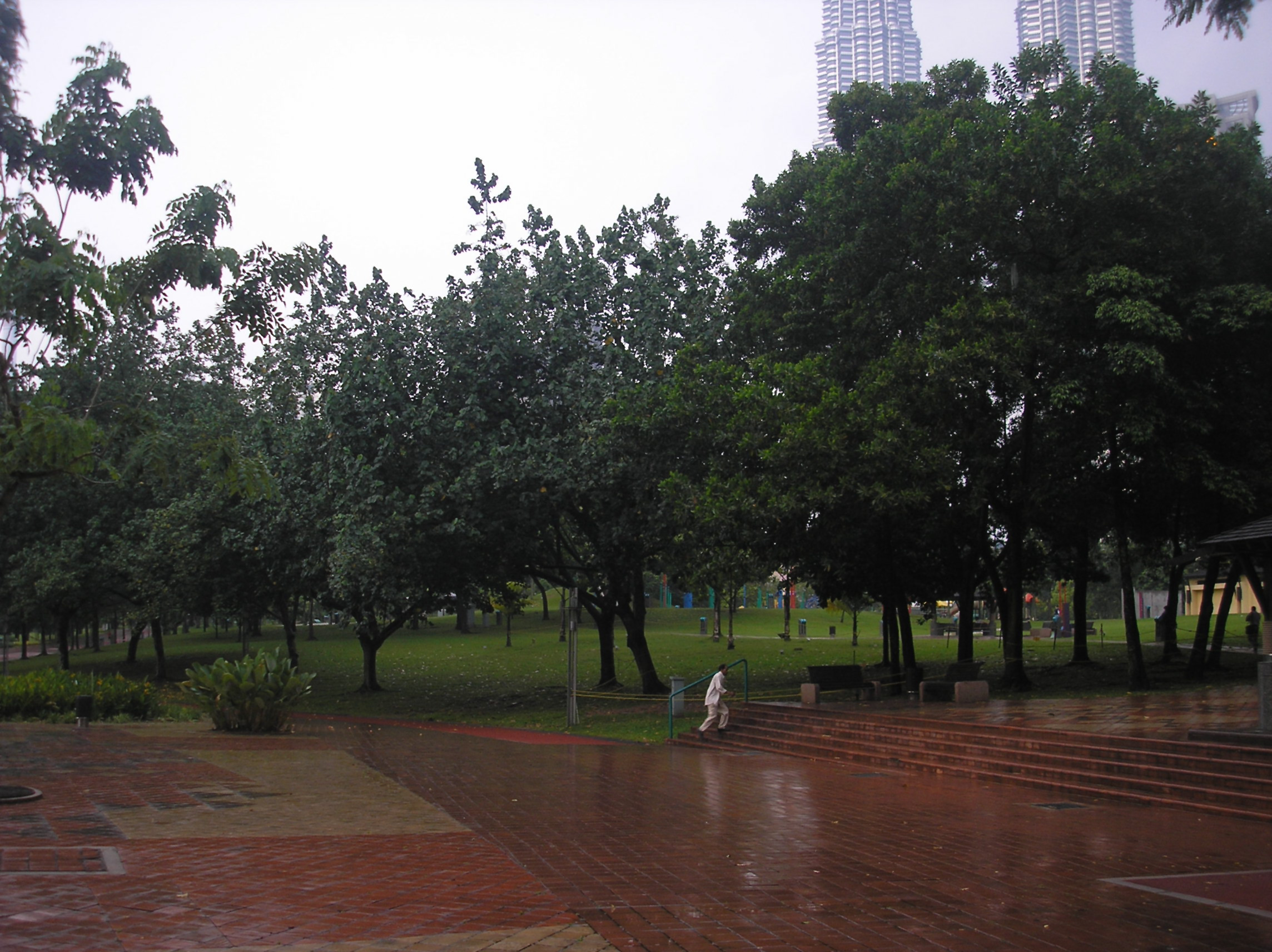
View of the south east section of the park

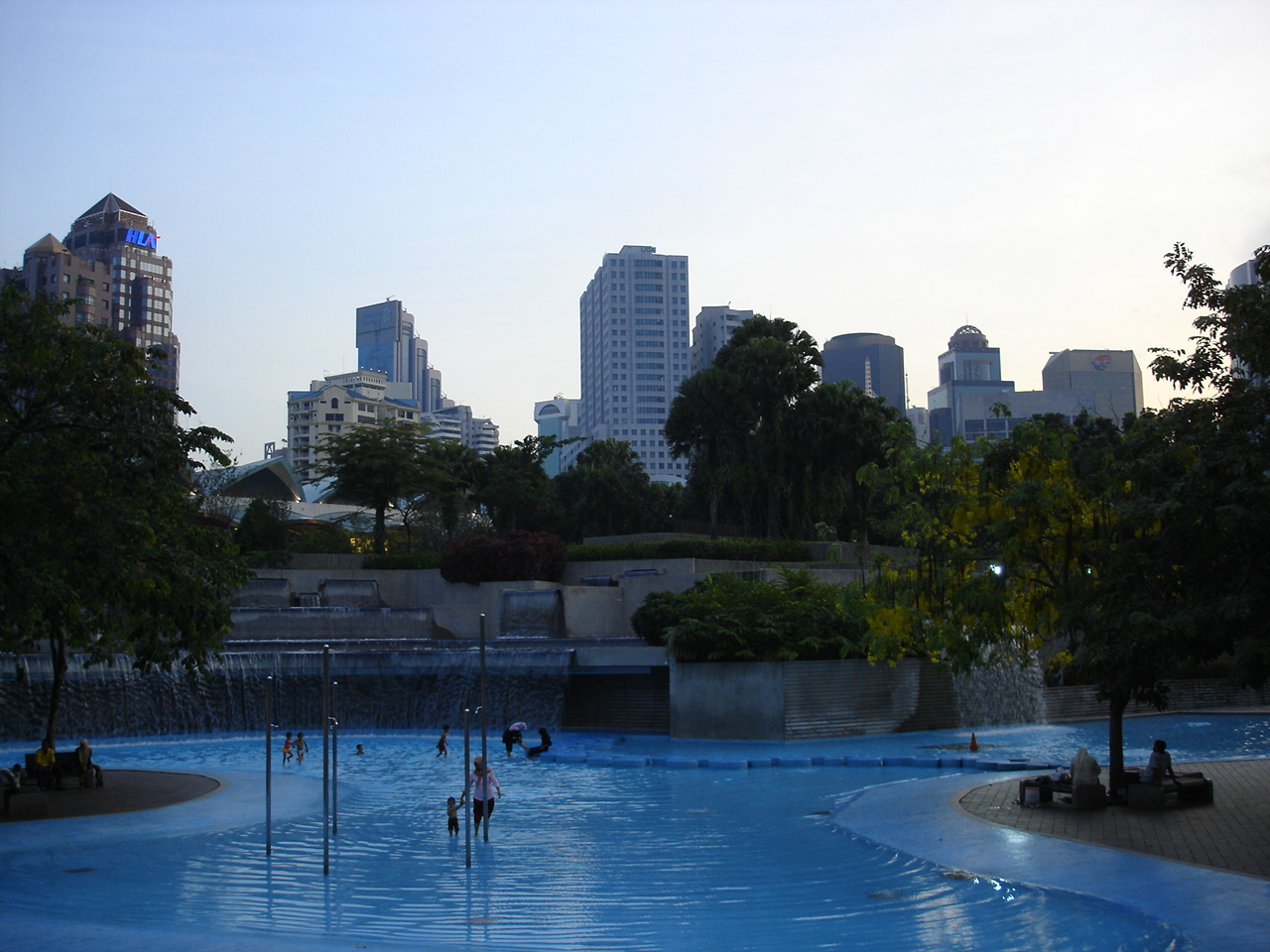
Children Pool

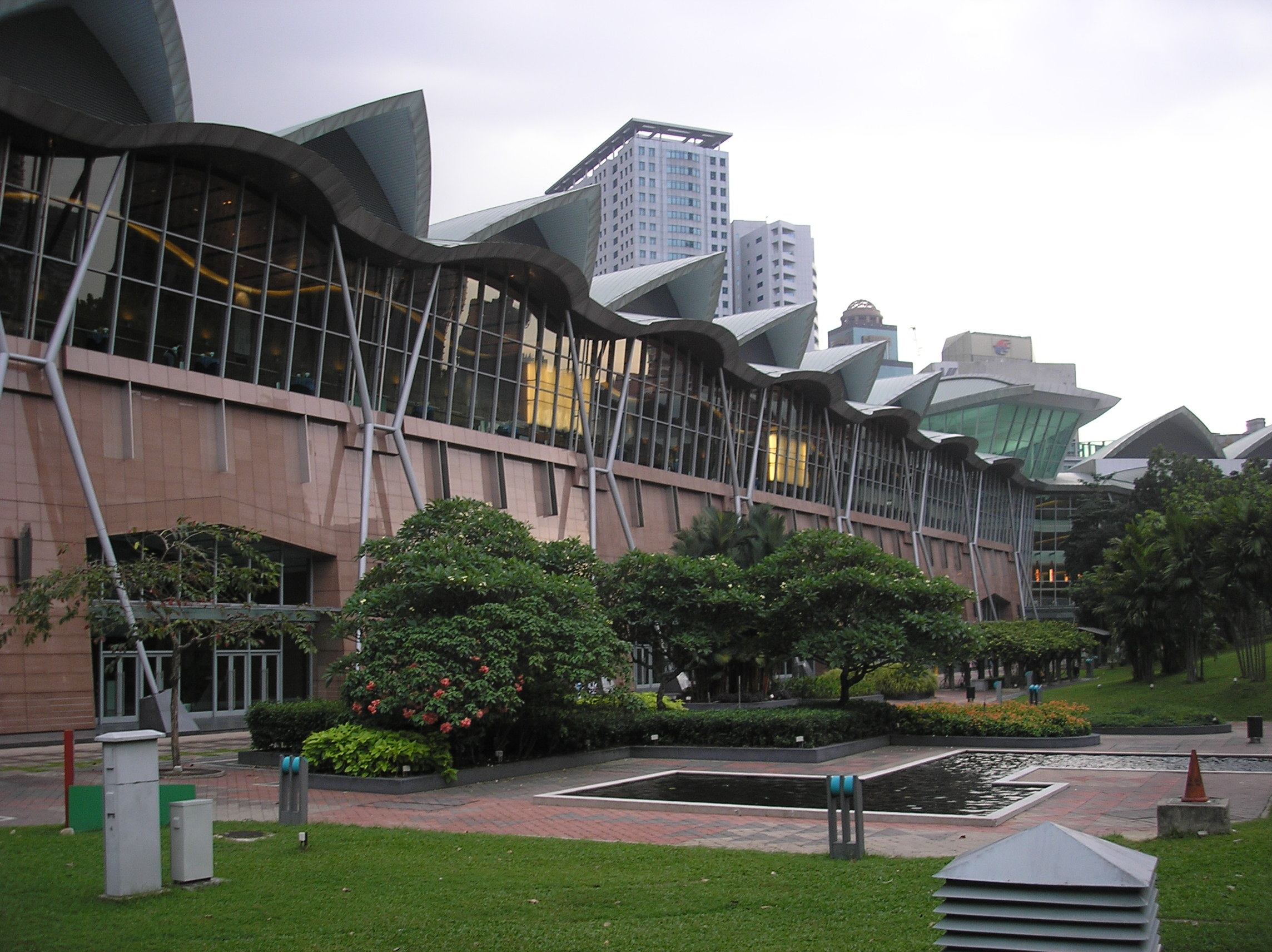
Portions of the park facing the Kuala Lumpur Convention Centre

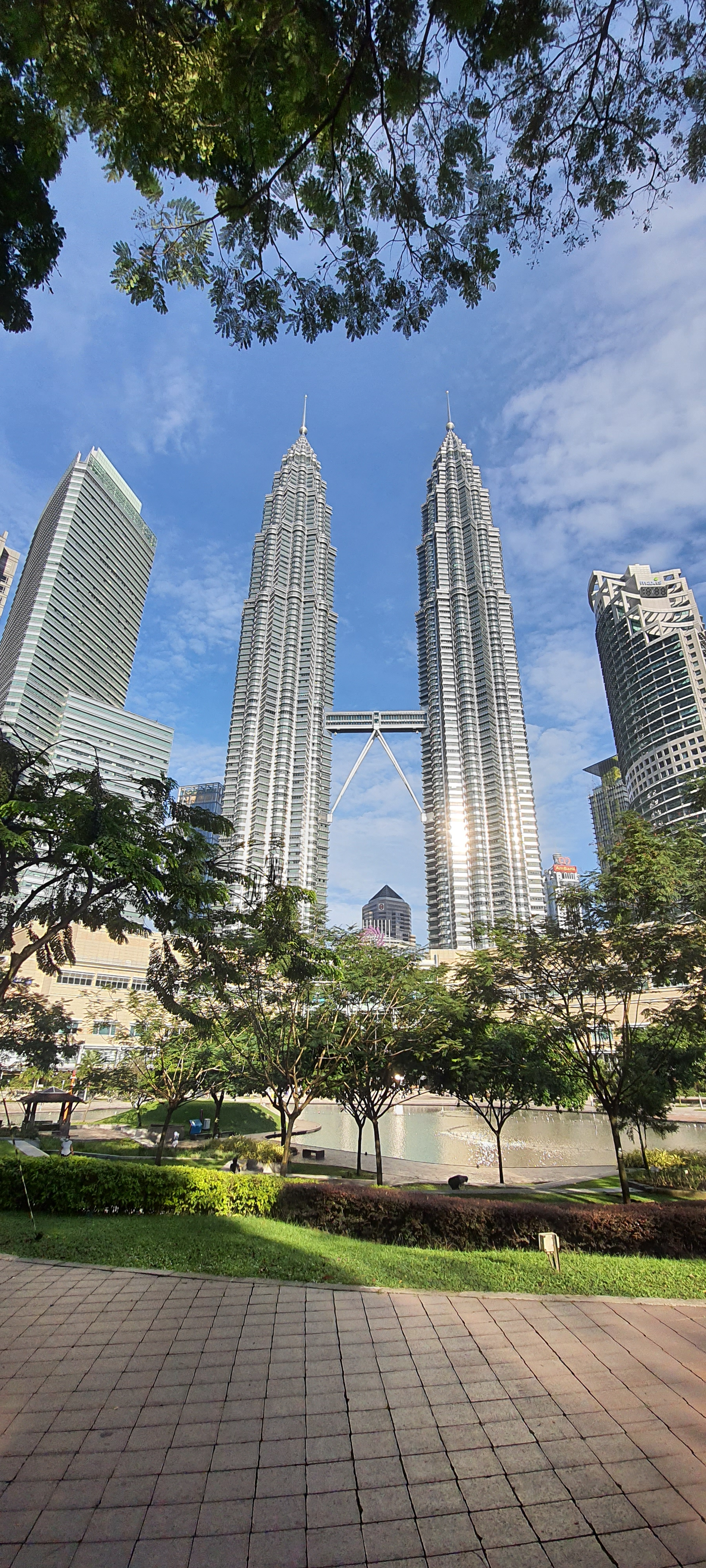
Petronas Twin Towers as seen from KLCC Park.

== Incidents of Crime ==
Three women were attacked during a mugging incident on the night of 30 June 2014.
