= Petronas Gallery =

Art gallery in Kuala Lumpur, Malaysia

Coordinates: 3.1574916°N 101.7090154°E

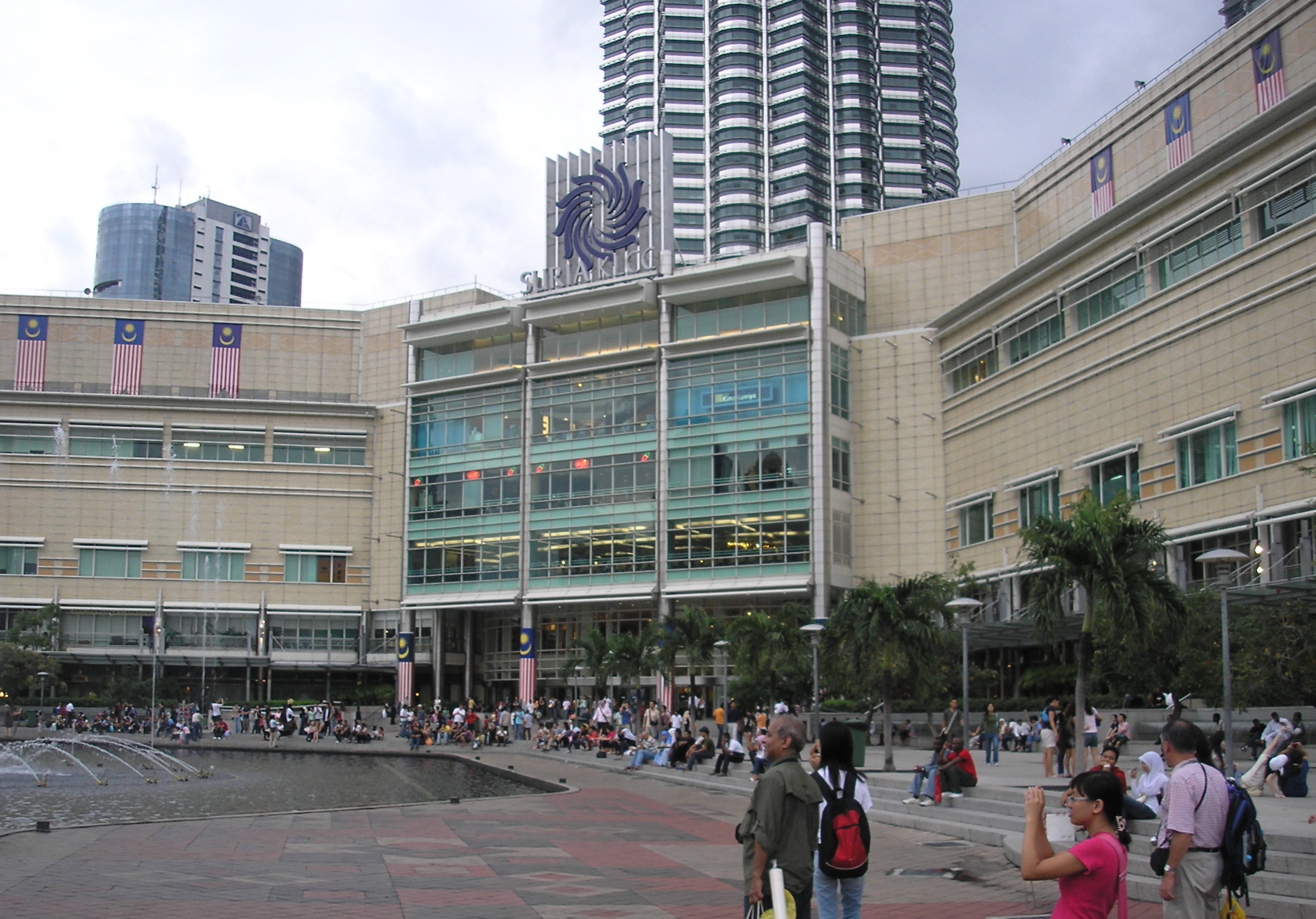
The gallery was located in Suria KLCC from 1998 to 2021.

The Petronas Gallery (Malay: Galeri Petronas) is a contemporary art gallery established in 1993 by the Malaysian multinational company Petronas to promote arts and culture.

== History ==
The Petronas Gallery was established as a corporate gallery in 1993. It was first located inside the Dayabumi Complex, the former headquarters of Petronas. Its establishment created a major new venue for the display of visual art in Kuala Lumpur. In the gallery, Petronas sponsored many art exhibitions showing works of both local and foreign artists.

The gallery was relocated to the third level of Suria KLCC in 1998. The new circular gallery of 2000 sq meters was almost three times the size of its former location in the Dayabumi Complex.

In May 2021, the Petronas Gallery ceased to operate as a public gallery as of May 2021 following a realignment of its operating model to adapt to the changes brought about by the COVID-19 pandemic. Although exhibitions were temporarily halted, the gallery space remained open to host various cultural and corporate events.

In 2026, the gallery will reopen in Ombak KLCC, located next to the KLCC Park.

== Objectives ==
The gallery managed and administered the Petronas sponsorship programme for the visual arts. As part of this programme, the corporation provided and maintained the gallery as a venue for Malaysian artists to display their artwork and to undertake activities for their further development. The gallery also hosted foreign exhibitions.

The gallery offered a wide range of art appreciation and educational programmes, in addition to an active programme of exhibitions. Forums and seminars discussing various art issues were organised on a regular basis.

== Design ==
Robert Gaukroger designed the Gallery located at level 3 of the Petronas Twin Towers as part of a consortium with Pakatan Architects and Equus Design, when Robert was living in Malaysia. The design was a competition entry which was held by Petronas. Robert Gaukroger's design philosophy for the gallery was a simple multifunctional space which was a safe container for the display of art, beautifully detailed, although not competing with the works on display. influences of Carlo Scarpa are present in some of the detailing including the reception desk (a single piece of black granite) and a sculptural wall of glass and concrete in the reception area.

In addition to a total art display space of 1135.92 m^{2}, the gallery was also equipped with two multimedia spaces each measuring 30.1 m^{2}, three dry workshops each measuring 46 m^{2}, and a lecture room measuring 40.97 m^{2}. These multi-purpose spaces were used for art demonstrations, forums, classes and lectures, performances and other art activities.

Woods Bagot provided detail design and site regulation services for the premiere art gallery facilities. The 2207.38 m^{2} facility incorporated mobile walling system and flexible lighting, retail shops, workshop studio and electronic library.

== Literature ==
- Lenzi, Iola (2004). Museums of Southeast Asia. Singapore: Archipelago Press. pp. 200 pages. ISBN 981-4068-96-9.
- Ho, Raymond (E-Poch.com) (2012). IRRESISTIBLE WEAR. Malaysia: Galeri Petronas. pp. 100 pages. ISBN 978-983-9738-87-2.
