= As Syakirin Mosque =

Mosque in KLCC, Kuala Lumpur, Malaysia

- Masjid As Syakirin مسجد الشاكرين
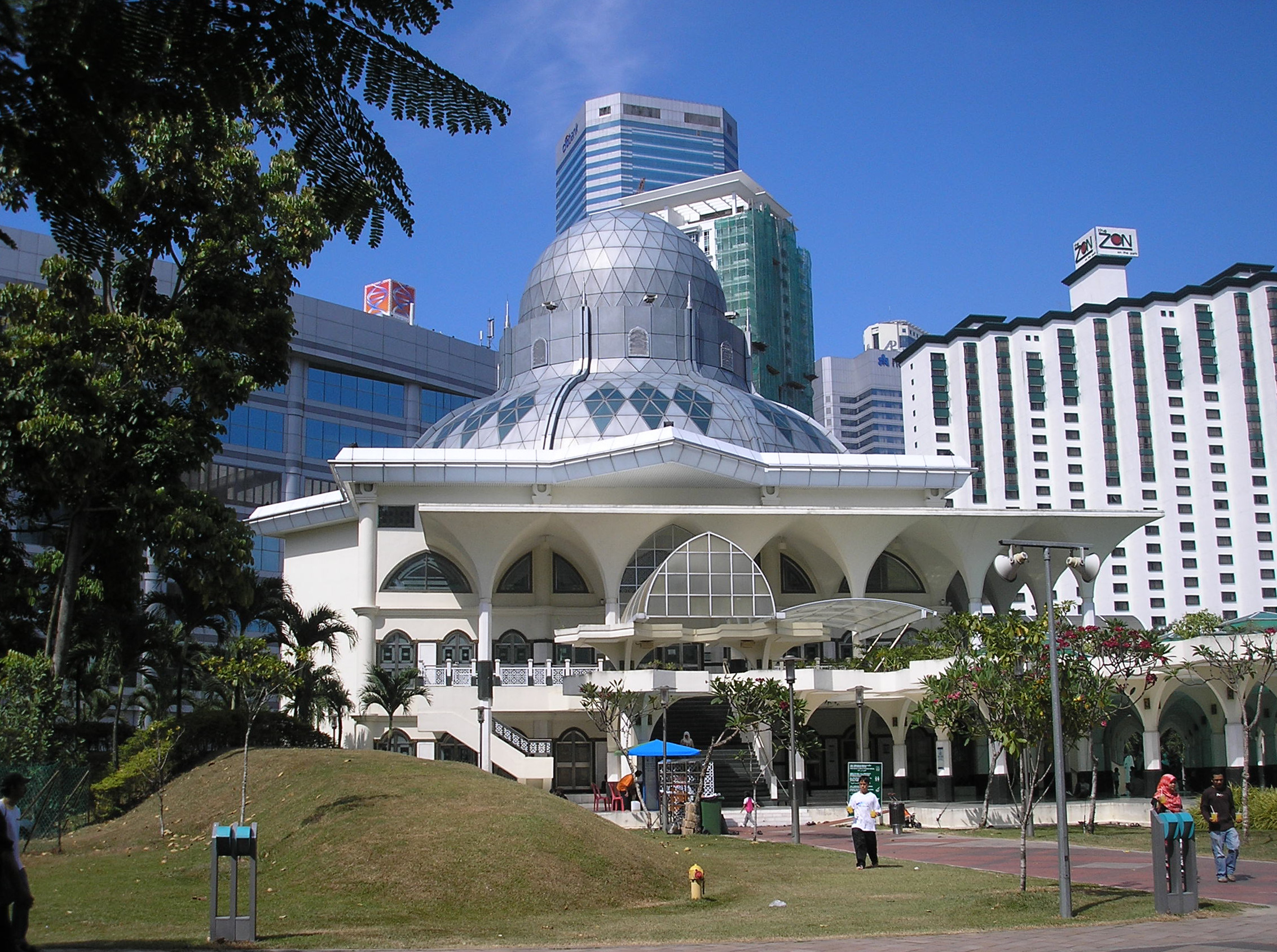

Religion
- Affiliation: Islam

Location
- Location: Kuala Lumpur, Malaysia
- Interactive map of As Syakirin Mosque
- Administration: Federal Territory Islamic Religious Council (MAIWP)
- Coordinates: 3°9′26″N 101°42′58″E

Architecture
- Type: Mosque
- Style: Islamic, Modernist
- Established: 1996
- Completed: renovations: 2009

The As Syakirin Mosque (Malay: Masjid As Syakirin), also known as KLCC Mosque, is a mosque located in the Kuala Lumpur City Centre, Kuala Lumpur, Malaysia. The mosque is situated near the Suria KLCC shopping centre and the Petronas Twin Towers, the tallest twin towers in the world.

In 2009, the mosque went through a major renovation to increase the capacity from 6000 people to 12,000 people.

Mosque initially registered as a prayer on 12 July 1999 for Petronas staff, and status as a mosque before being administered by the Federal Territory Islamic Religious Council (religious council).

This two-storey mosque area of 21 hectares. It is regarded as the jewel in the park because of its strategic location and facing KLCC Park also provides a hall that can accommodate up to 500 people with audio system complete with meeting rooms and room remains.

Ash-Syakirin name means' the people of the grateful chosen as the official name for this mosque. The mosque is an architectural landmark of Islam in a rapidly developing area in the capital city, Kuala Lumpur.

== See also ==
- Islam in Malaysia
