= Suria KLCC =

Shopping mall in KLCC, Kuala Lumpur, Malaysia

Coordinates: 3°9′N 101°43′E

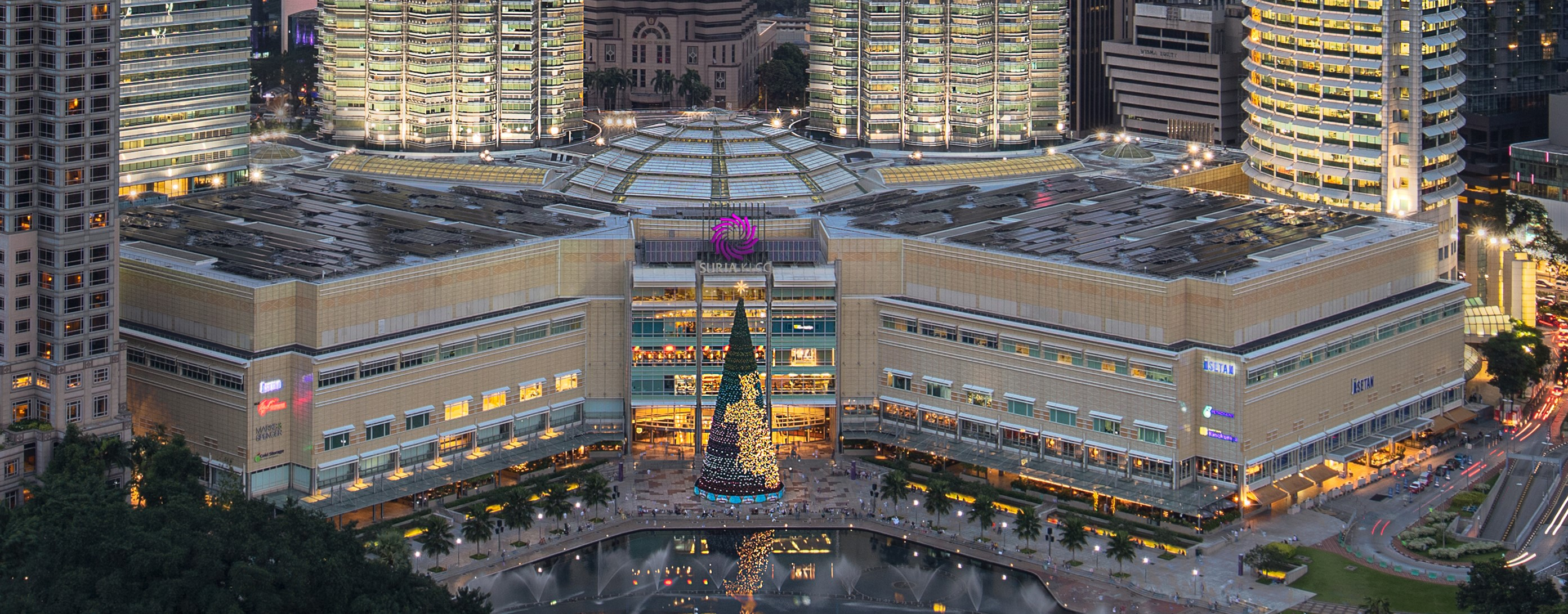
- Suria KLCC in 2019
- Location: Kuala Lumpur City Centre, Kuala Lumpur, Malaysia
- Opened: 8 May 1998; 28 years ago
- Developer: KLCC Property Holdings Berhad
- Manager: Suria KLCC Sdn. Bhd.
- Owner: KLCC Property Berhad / CBRE Global Investors
- Num. of stores: 380
- Floor area: 140,000 m^{2} (1,500,000 sq ft)
- Floors: 6
- Parking: 5400
- Public transit: KJ10 KLCC LRT station PY21 Persiaran KLCC MRT station (700m)
- Website: www.suriaklcc.com.my

Suria KLCC is a 6-storey shopping mall located at the foot of the Petronas Twin Towers. Suria KLCC is a premier shopping destination with over 300 flagship stores. The shopping mall is situated in Kuala Lumpur City Centre, Kuala Lumpur, Malaysia.

== History and design ==
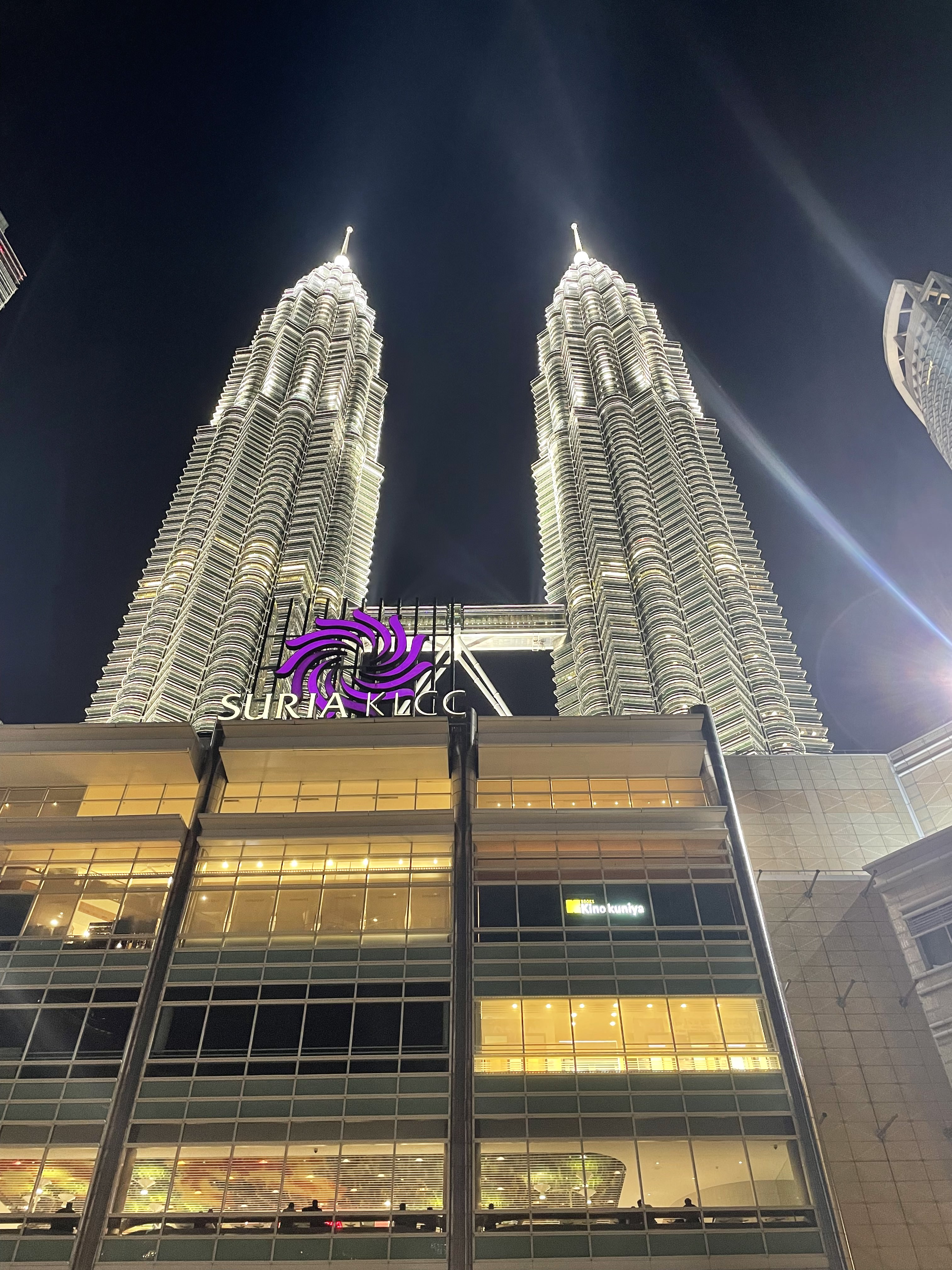
Exterior of the KLCC illuminated at night.

"Suria" is a native Malay word derived from Sanskrit "surya", meaning "sunshine". Opened on 8 May 1998, the shopping mall was conceived as part of the Kuala Lumpur City Centre (KLCC) project, constructed at the foot of the Petronas Twin Towers. The mall offers views of KLCC Park and Lake Symphony.

The mall's floor plan is crescent-shaped, featuring its three ground-level exits wings to Jalan Ampang, Jalan P. Ramlee, and Persiaran Petronas where direct access to the lobby of the towers, the Petronas Philharmonic Hall and Lake Symphony are available.

On the concourse level, the Light Rail Transit (LRT) entrance is available at the Ampang end, and the entrance to the Kuala Lumpur Convention Centre is via a tunnel off the centre court.

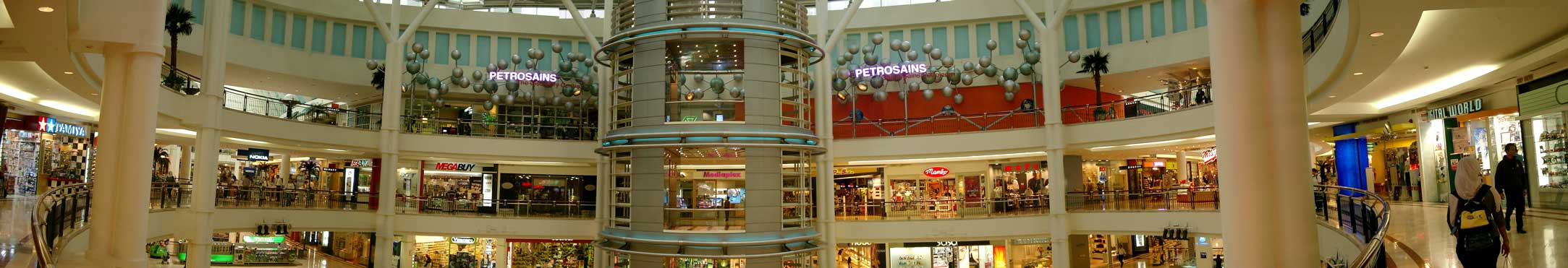
Panorama view of Suria KLCC

== Management ==
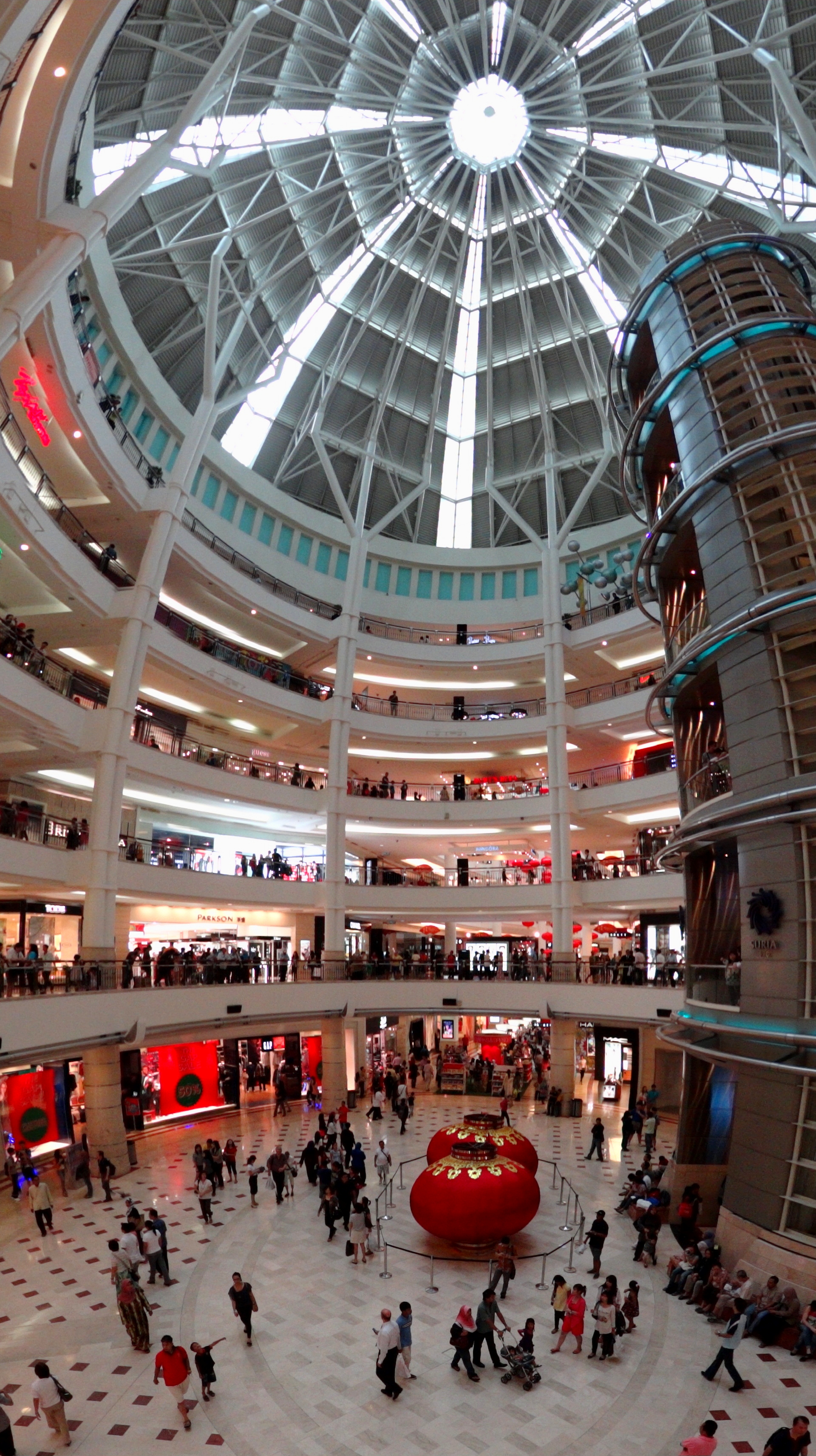
Interior of the Suria KLCC mall.

Suria KLCC is the largest retail property under the management of Suria KLCC Sdn. Bhd. Other properties under their management include Alamanda Putrajaya, a regional shopping centre, and Mesra Mall Terengganu, a sub-regional shopping centre.

== Transportation ==
The mall's Jalan Ampang entrance is a major rapidKL and GoKL bus hub. Examples of routes serving it are 402 (Maluri - Titiwangsa) and 300 (Pandan Mewah - Ampang - Lebuh Ampang/Jalan Munshi Abdullah).

Suria KLCC is connected to the underground KLCC LRT station, located at the “Ampang” end of the mall on the concourse level via an underground pedestrian walkway. Another underground station on the MRT Putrajaya Line named Persiaran KLCC MRT station is 700 metres from the mall.

There are 5400 parking bays in the mall basement parking lot.

== Features ==
Suria KLCC has 140,000 m^{2} (1,500,000 sq ft) of space. It has six levels and features mostly foreign luxury goods and high-street labels. The mall includes an art gallery, an underwater aquarium and also a Science Discovery centre. A 12 screen cinema, and a concert hall also reside in the mall.

Within KLCC Park, sited at the esplanade outside of Suria KLCC, lies the 10,000 sq ft man-made Lake Symphony. In the lake, two musical fountains are situated within.

== Gallery ==
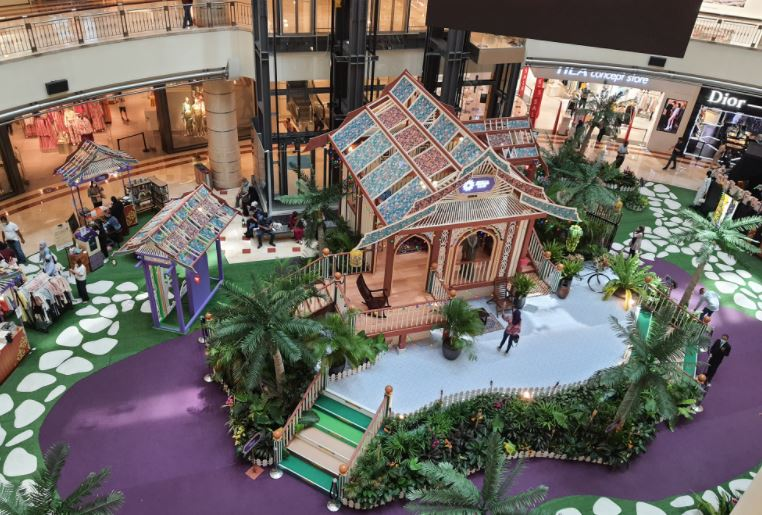
Kampung House decoration at Suria KLCC's centre court for Hari Raya

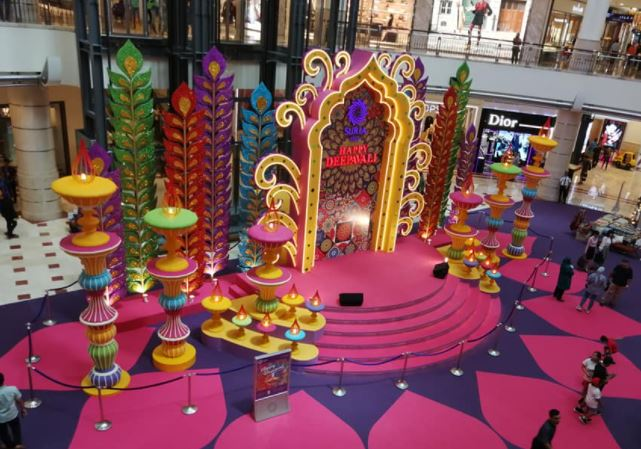
Deepavali decoration at Suria KLCC's centre court

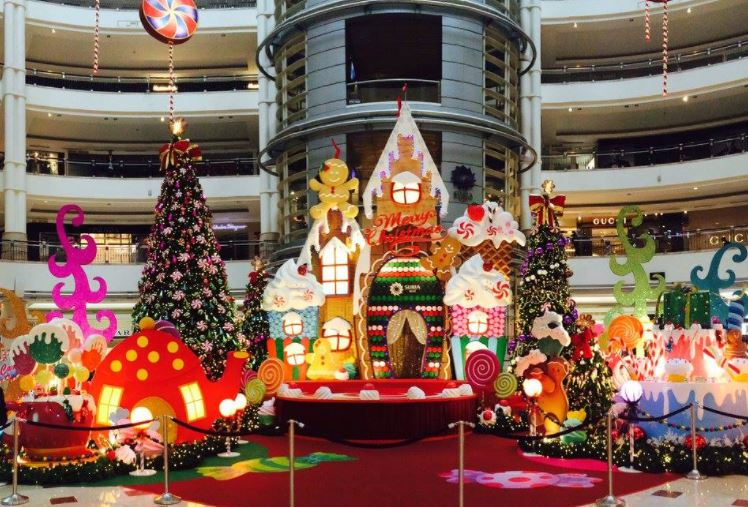
Christmas decoration at Suria KLCC's centre court

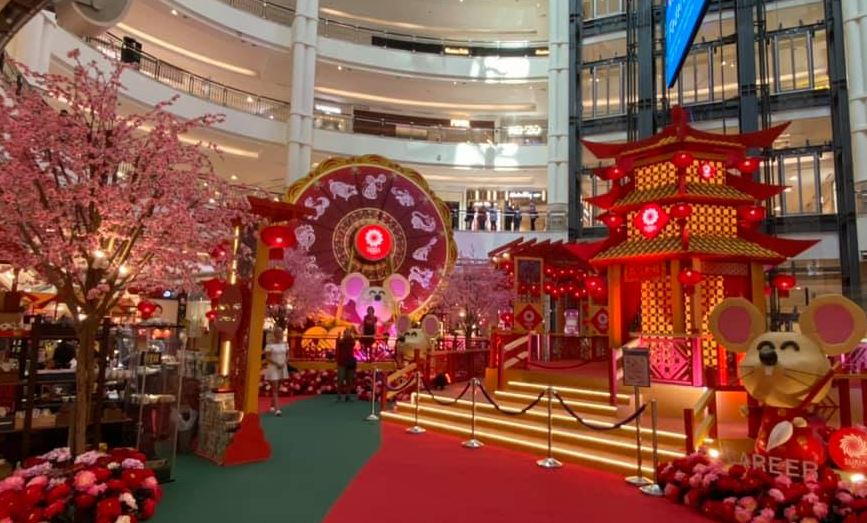
Chinese New Year decoration at Suria KLCC's centre court

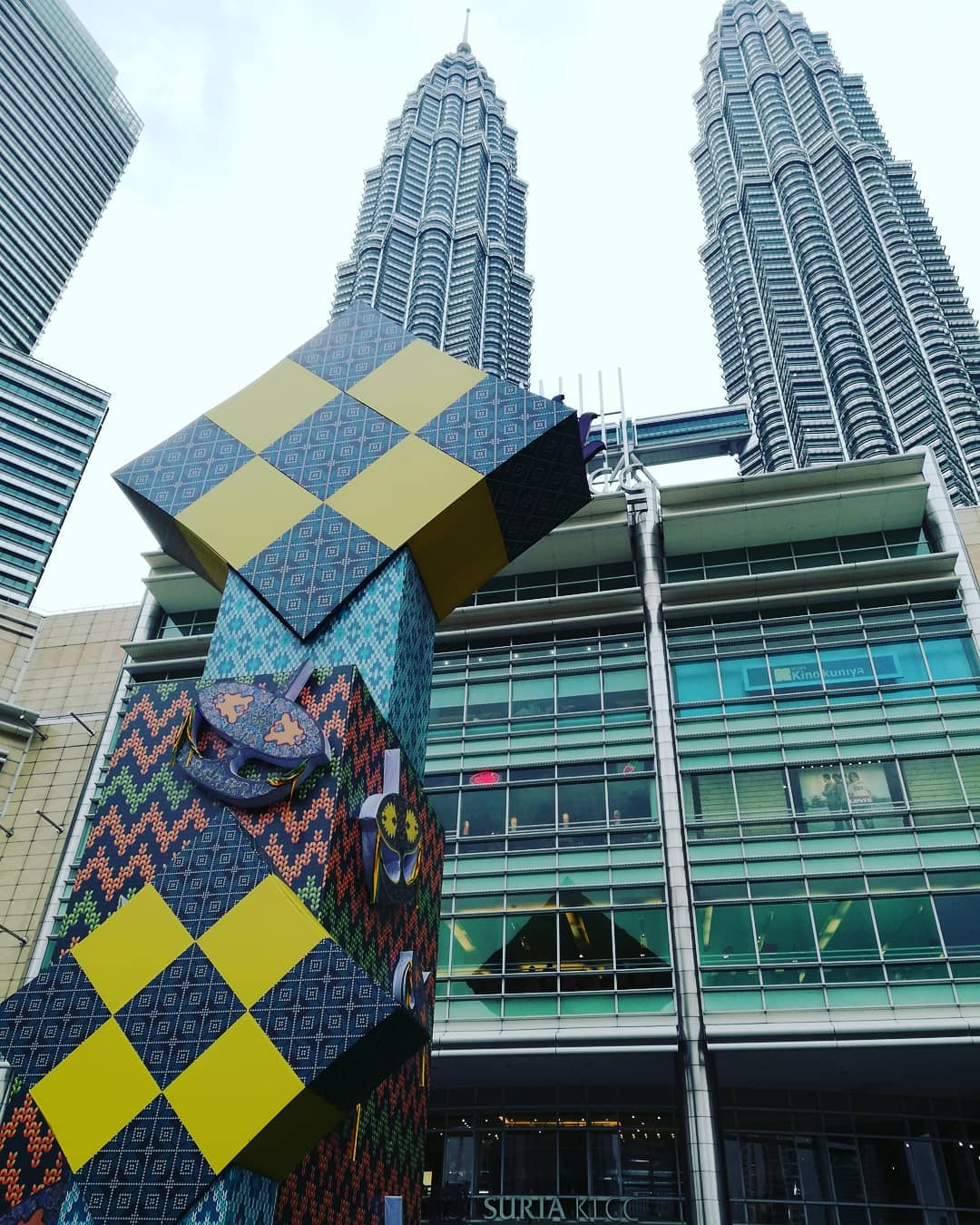
The Tallest Giant "Ketupat" Decoration for Raya at Suria KLCC

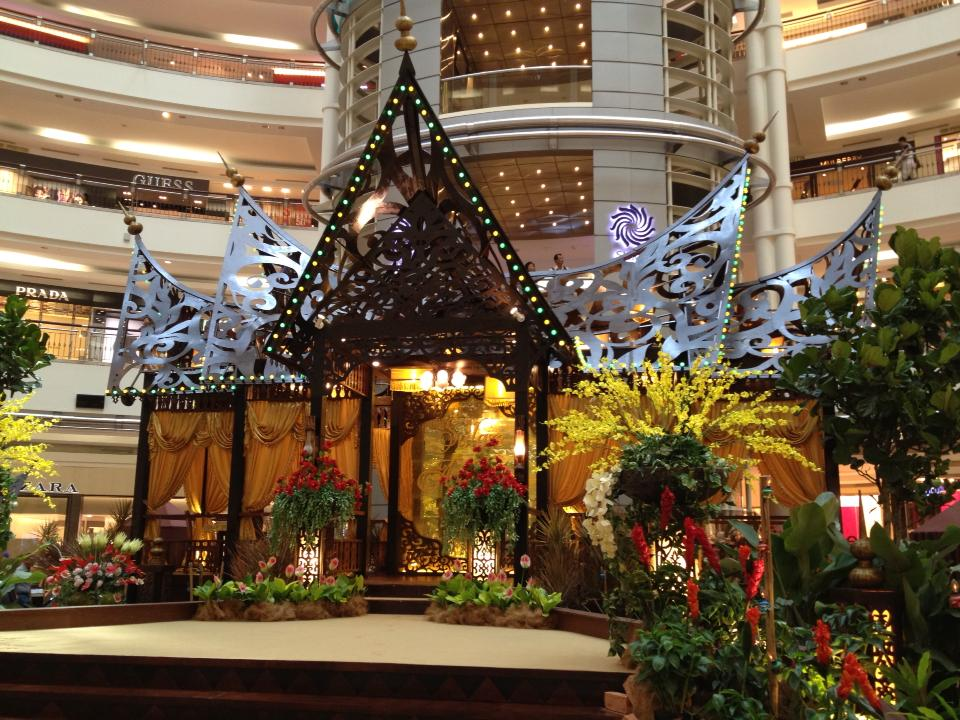
Minangkabau theme design during Raya decoration at Suria KLCC

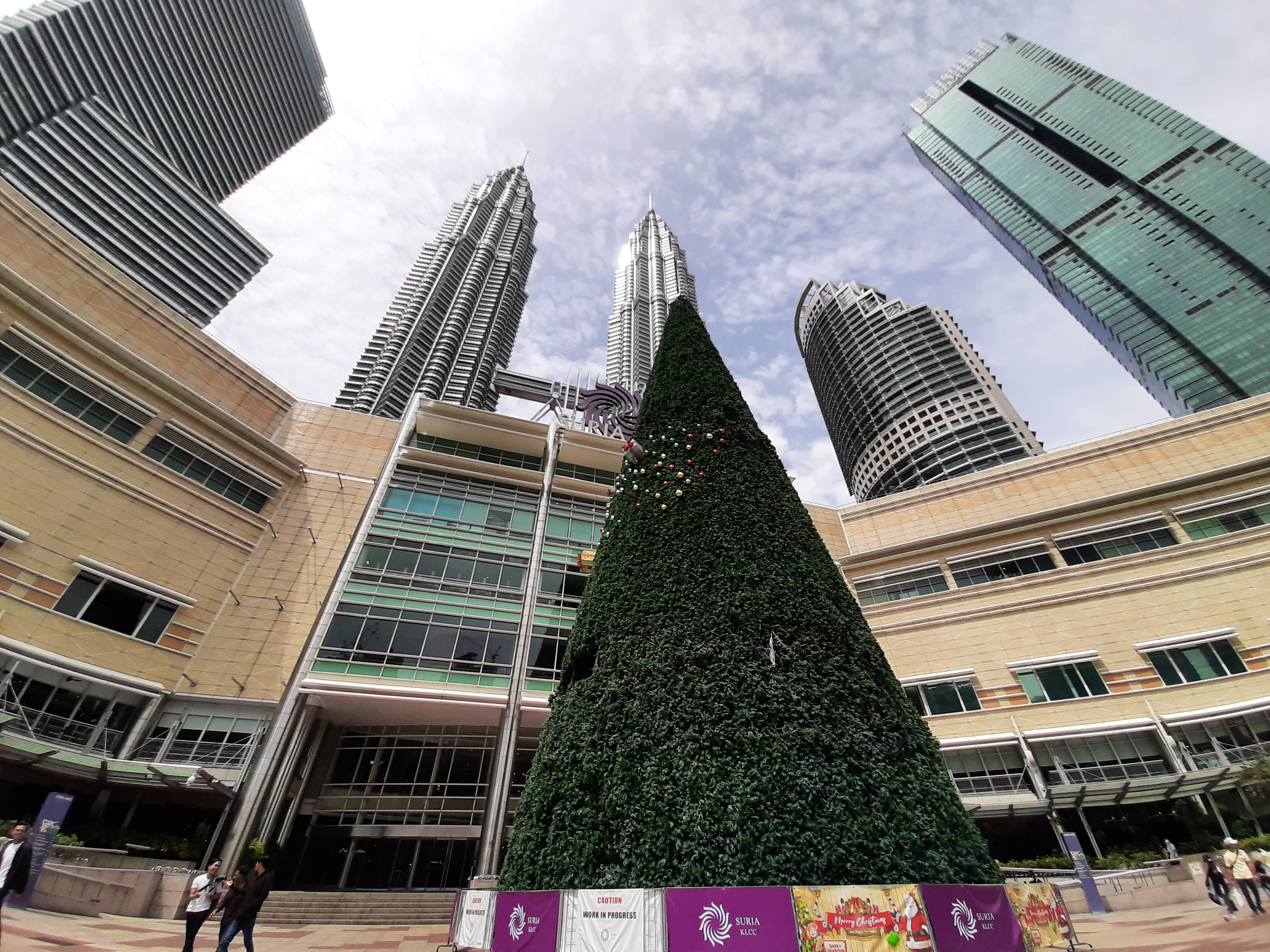
Christmas tree decorations outside Suria KLCC

== See also ==
- Shopping malls in Malaysia
