= List of tourist attractions in Kuala Lumpur =

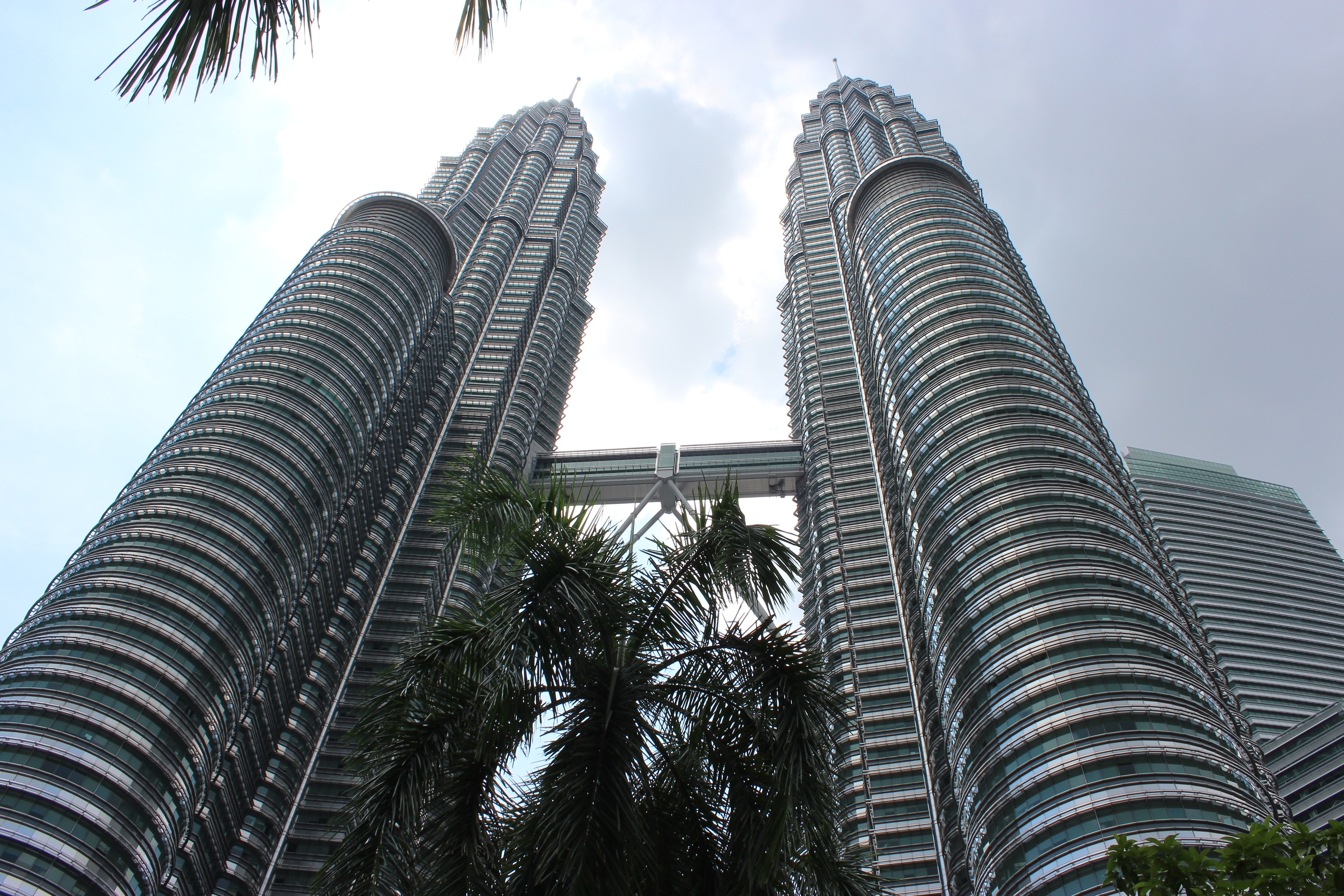
Petronas Towers

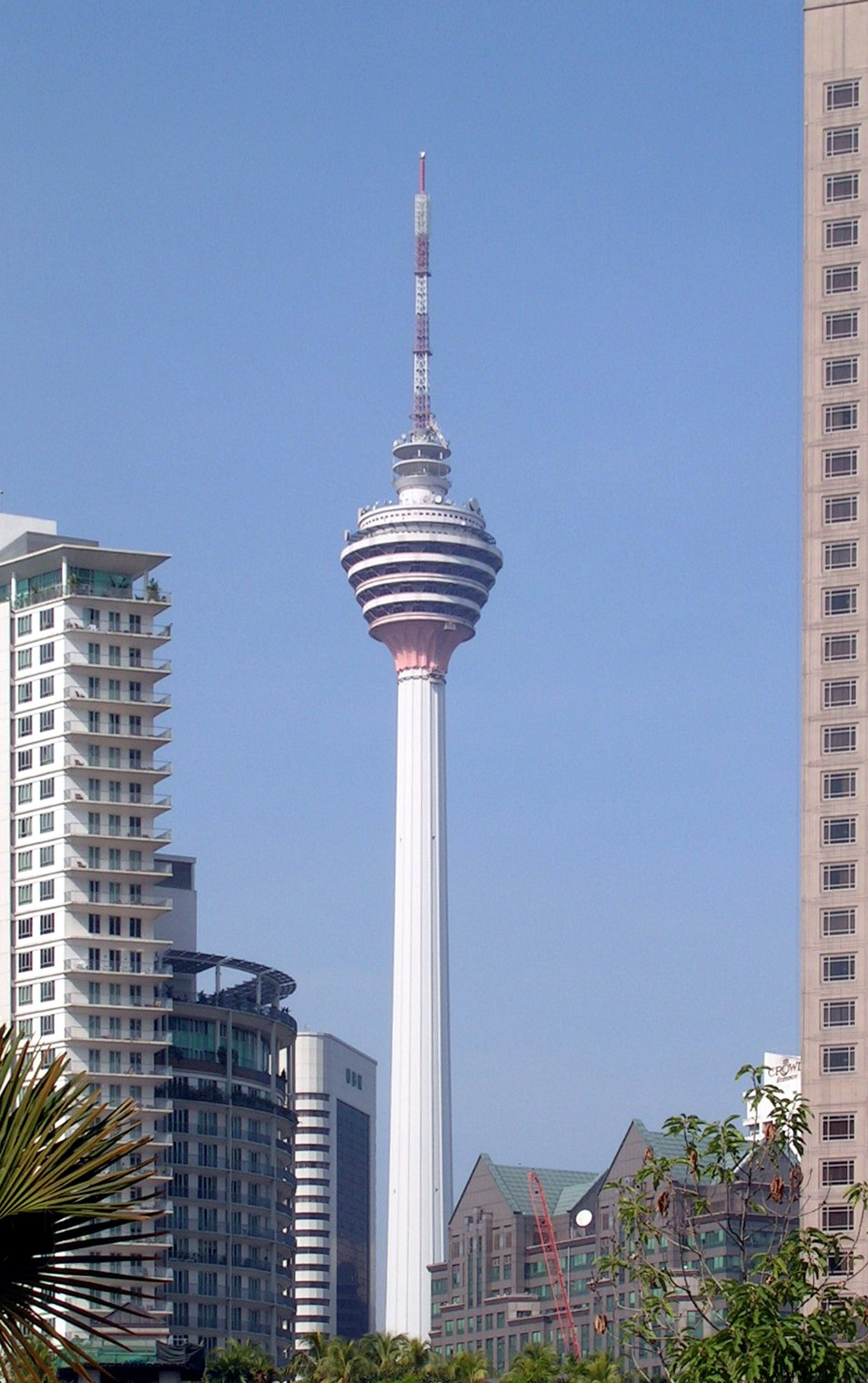
Kuala Lumpur Tower

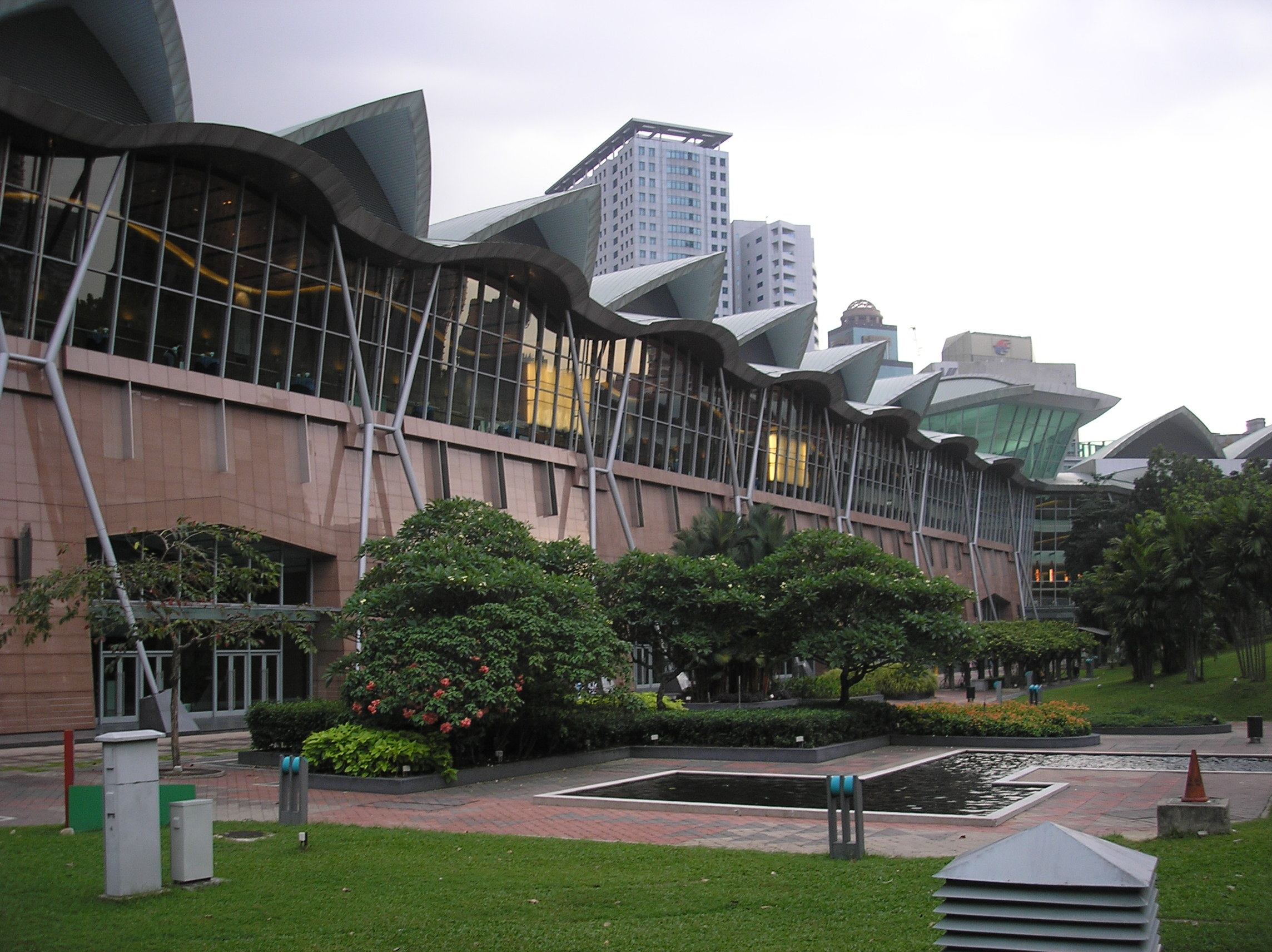
Kuala Lumpur Convention Centre

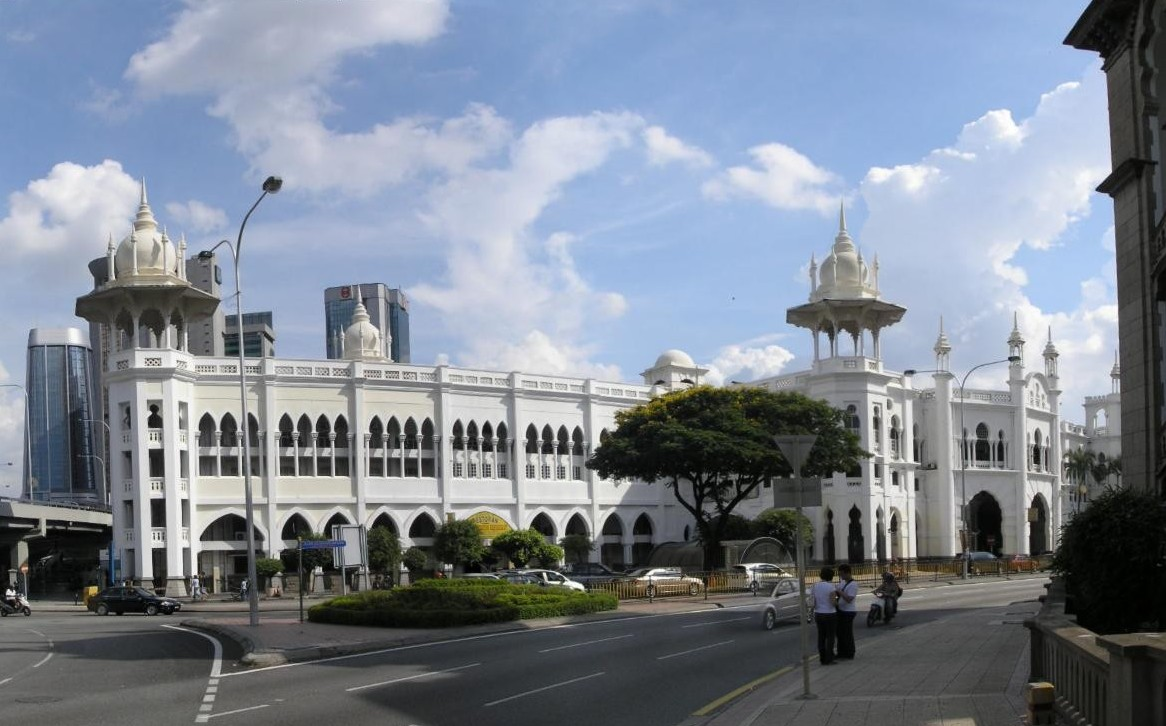
Kuala Lumpur Railway Station

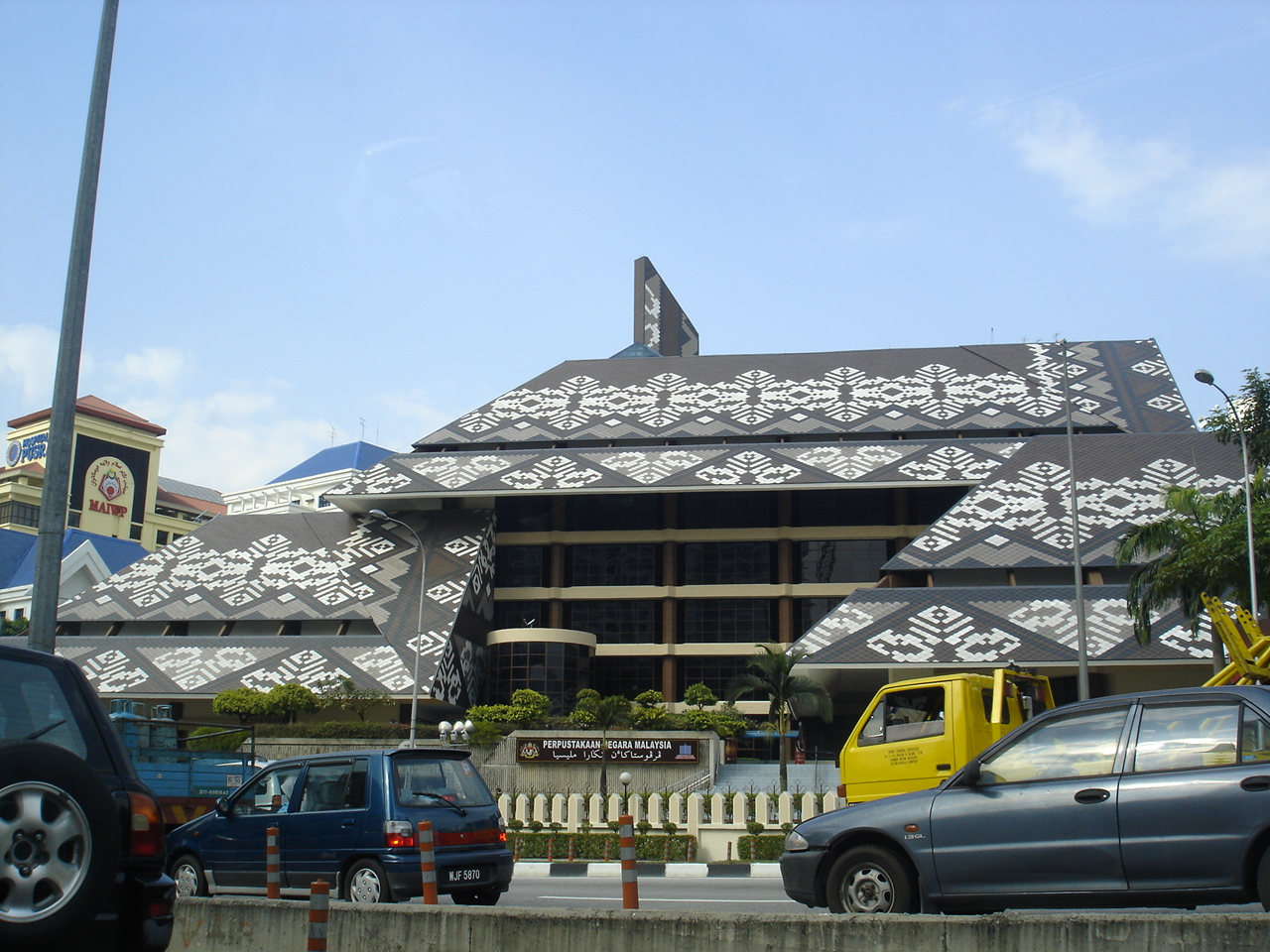
National Library of Malaysia

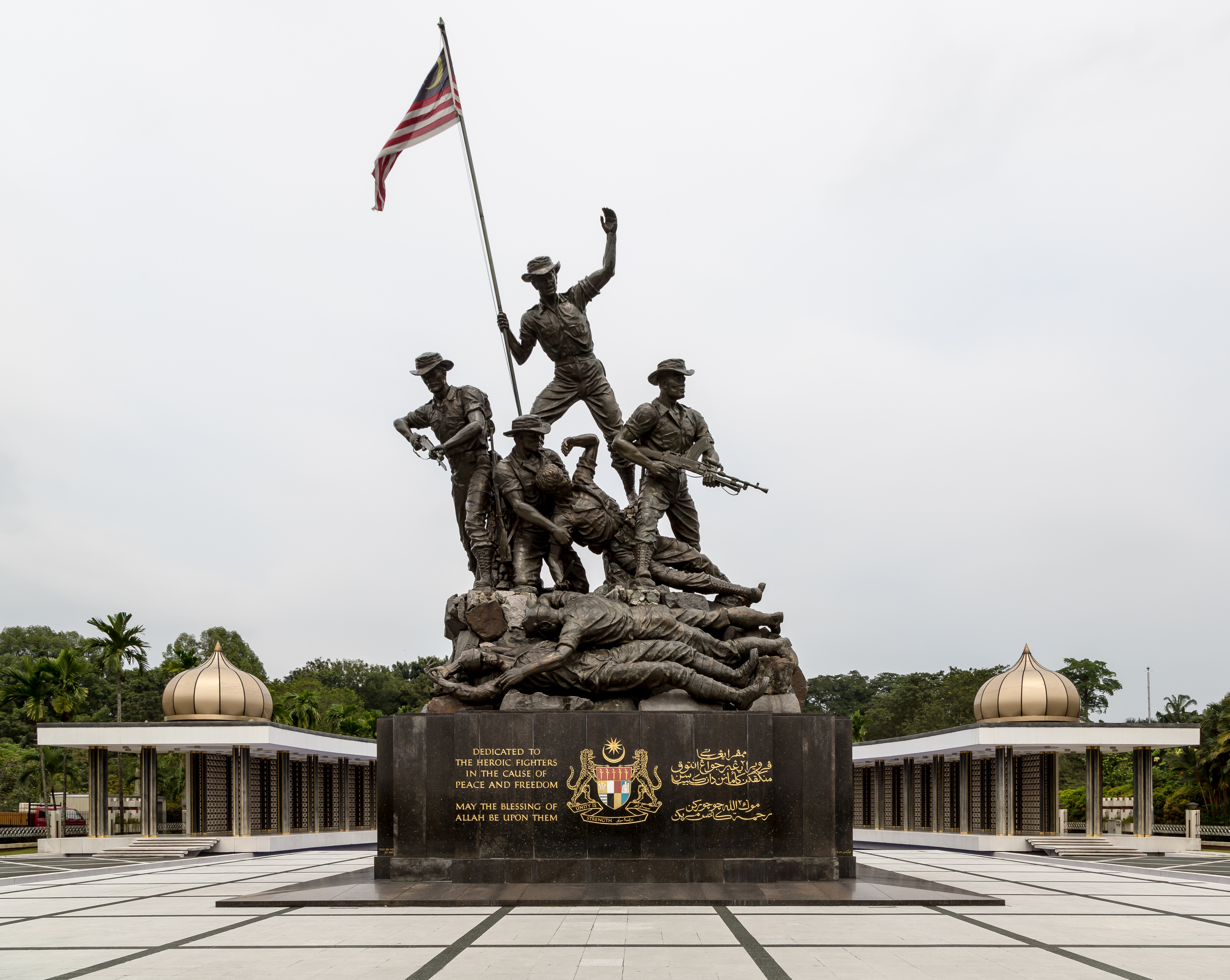
National Monument

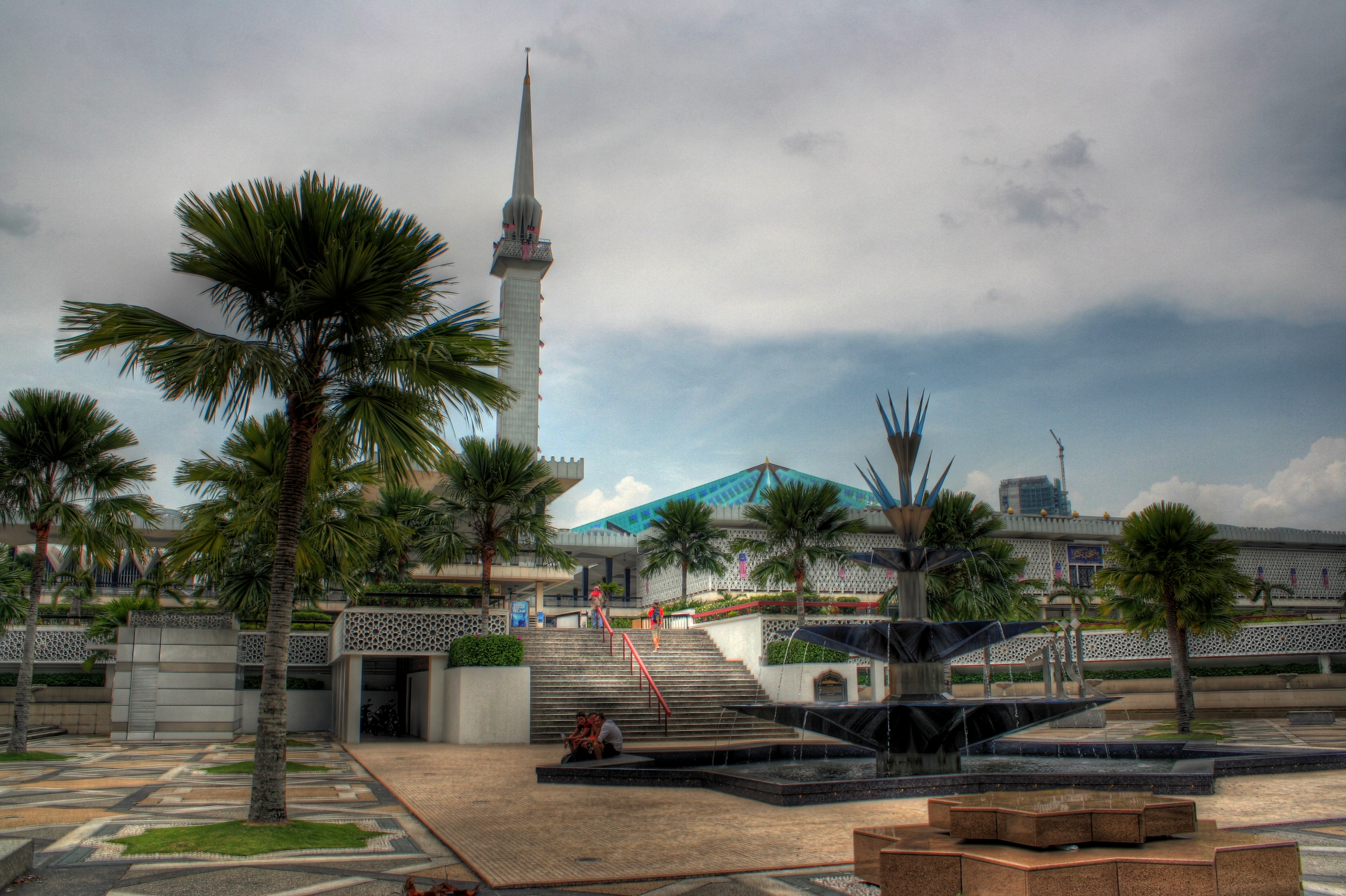
National Mosque of Malaysia

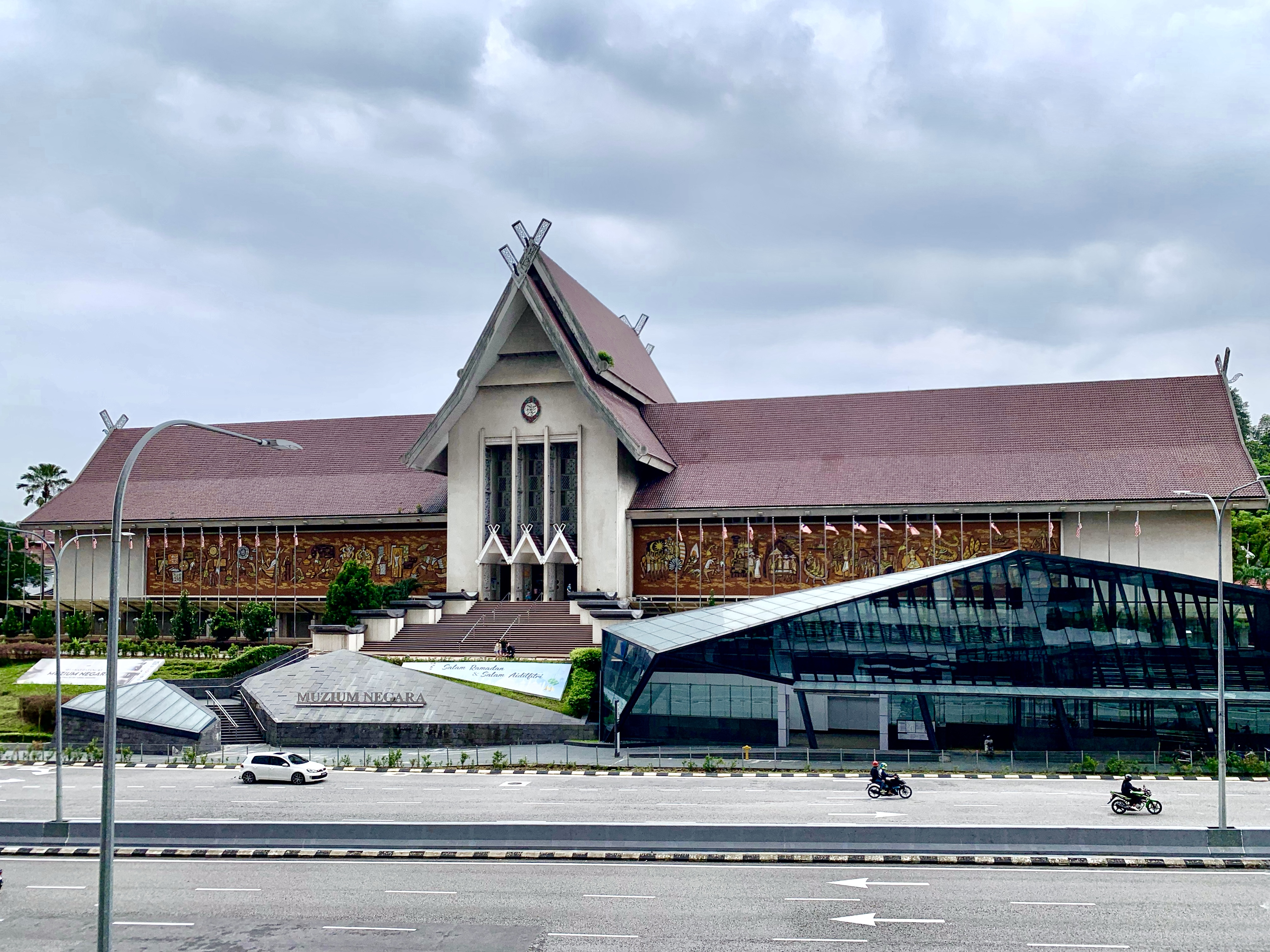
National Museum

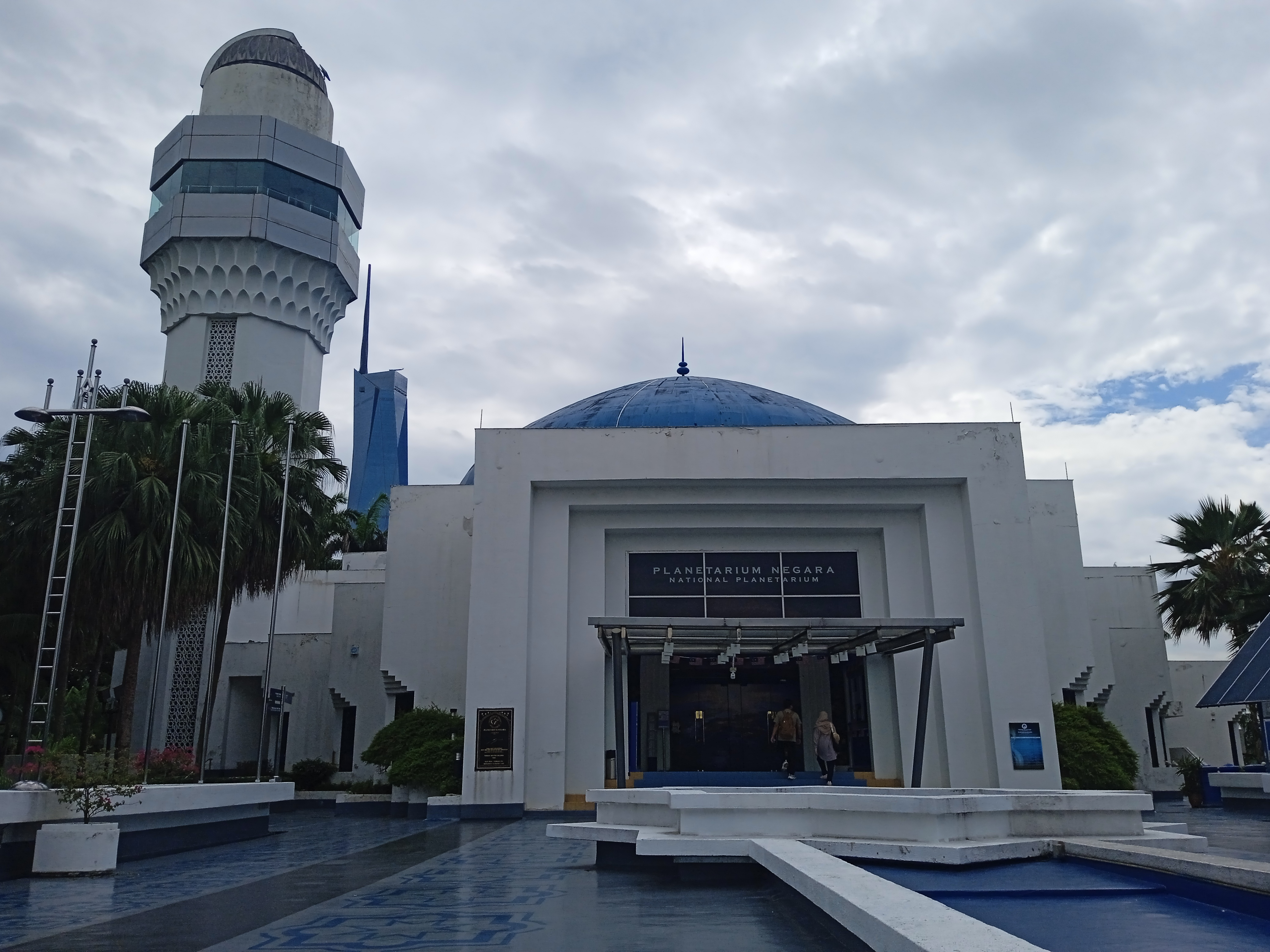
National Planetarium

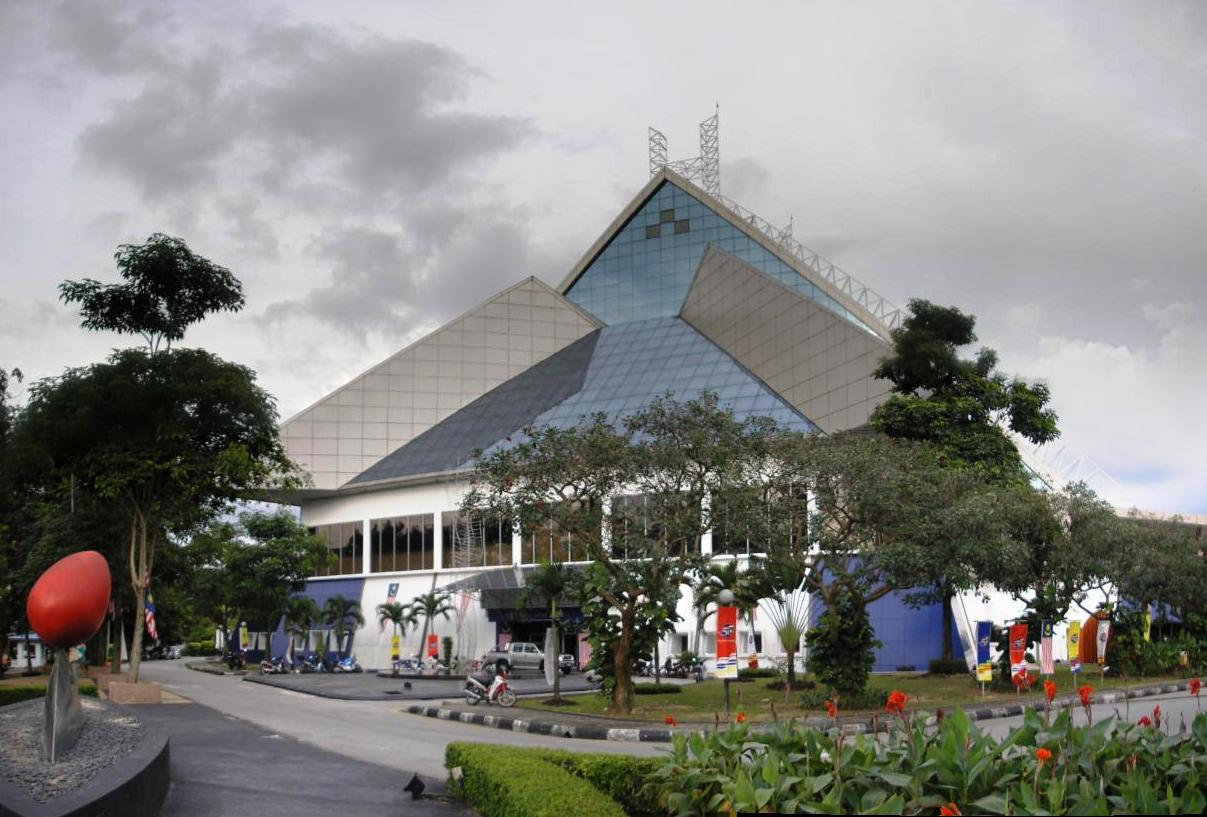
National Visual Arts Gallery

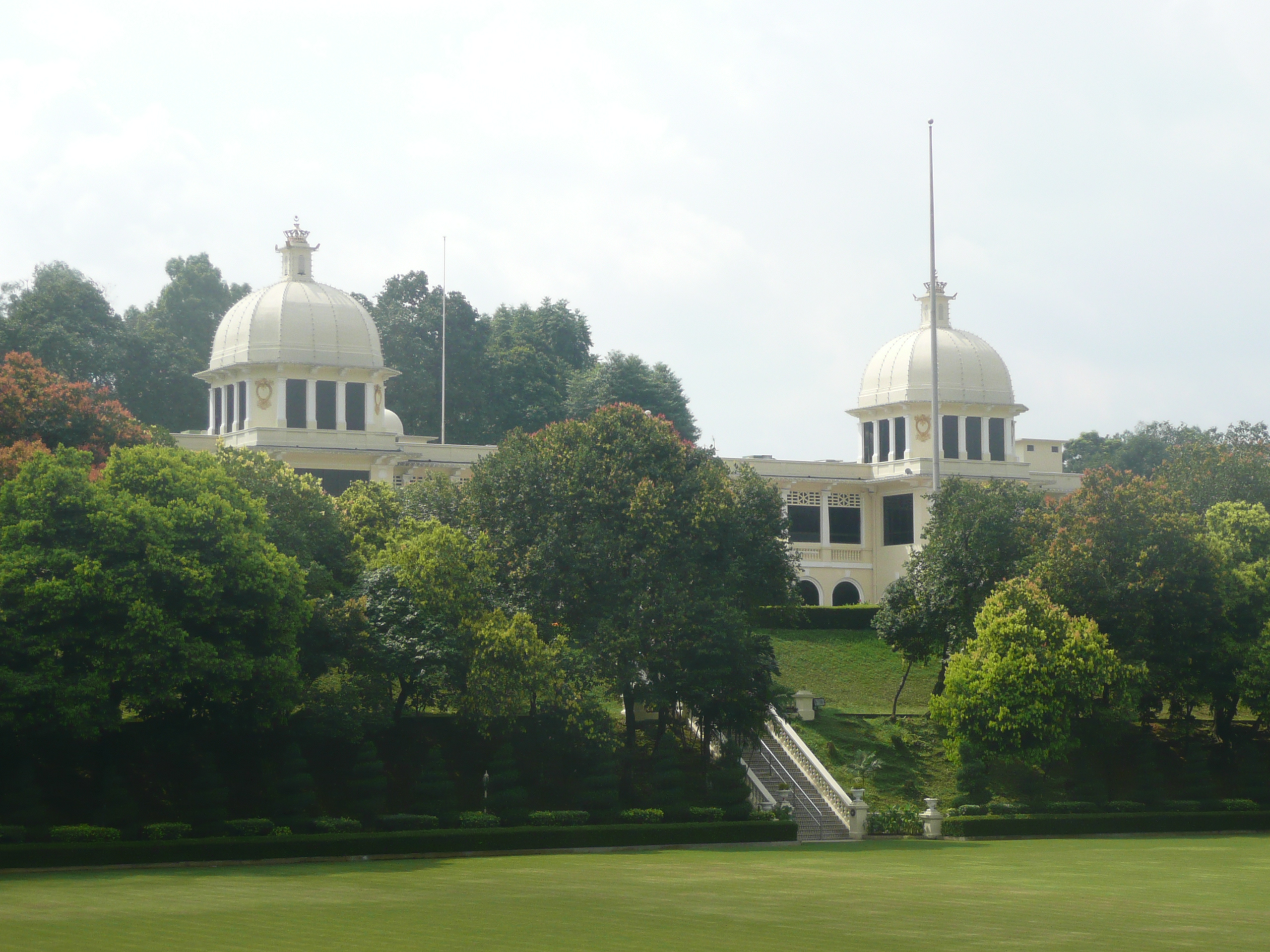
Royal Museum

This is the list of tourist attractions in Kuala Lumpur, Malaysia.

== Community ==
- Brickfields
- Petaling Street

== Convention centres ==
- Kuala Lumpur Convention Centre
- Malaysia International Trade and Exhibition Centre (MITEC)
- MATRADE Exhibition and Convention Centre
- Putra World Trade Centre (WTC KL)

== Galleries ==
- National Visual Arts Gallery
- Petronas Gallery

== Historical buildings ==
- DBKL City Theatre
- Lee Rubber Building
- Sultan Abdul Samad Building

== Libraries ==
- National Library of Malaysia
- Muthamizh Padippagam Library

== Memorials ==
- Heroes' Mausoleum
- National Monument

== Museums ==
- Islamic Arts Museum Malaysia
- Maybank Numismatic Museum
- National History Museum
- National Museum
- National Textile Museum
- Royal Malaysian Police Museum
- Royal Museum

== Nature ==
- ASEAN Sculpture Garden
- KLCC Park
- Lake Gardens
- Padang Balang
- Nanas Hill
- Rimba Ilmu Botanical Gardens

== Palace ==
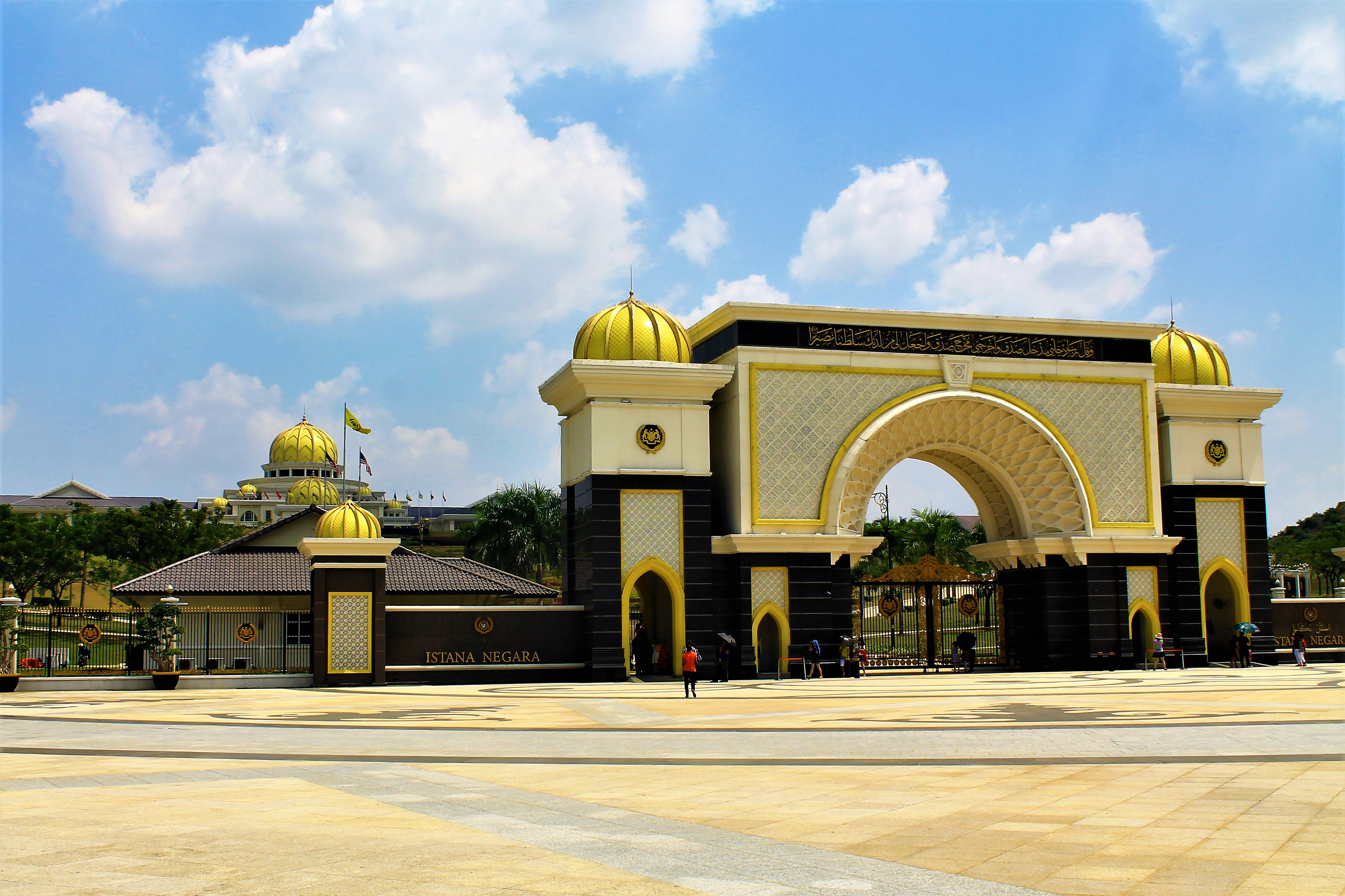
Istana Negara of Malaysia

- Istana Negara (National Palace)

== Performing centres ==
- Coliseum Theatre
- Istana Budaya
- Kuala Lumpur Performing Arts Centre
- Petronas Philharmonic Hall

== Public squares ==
- Merdeka Square
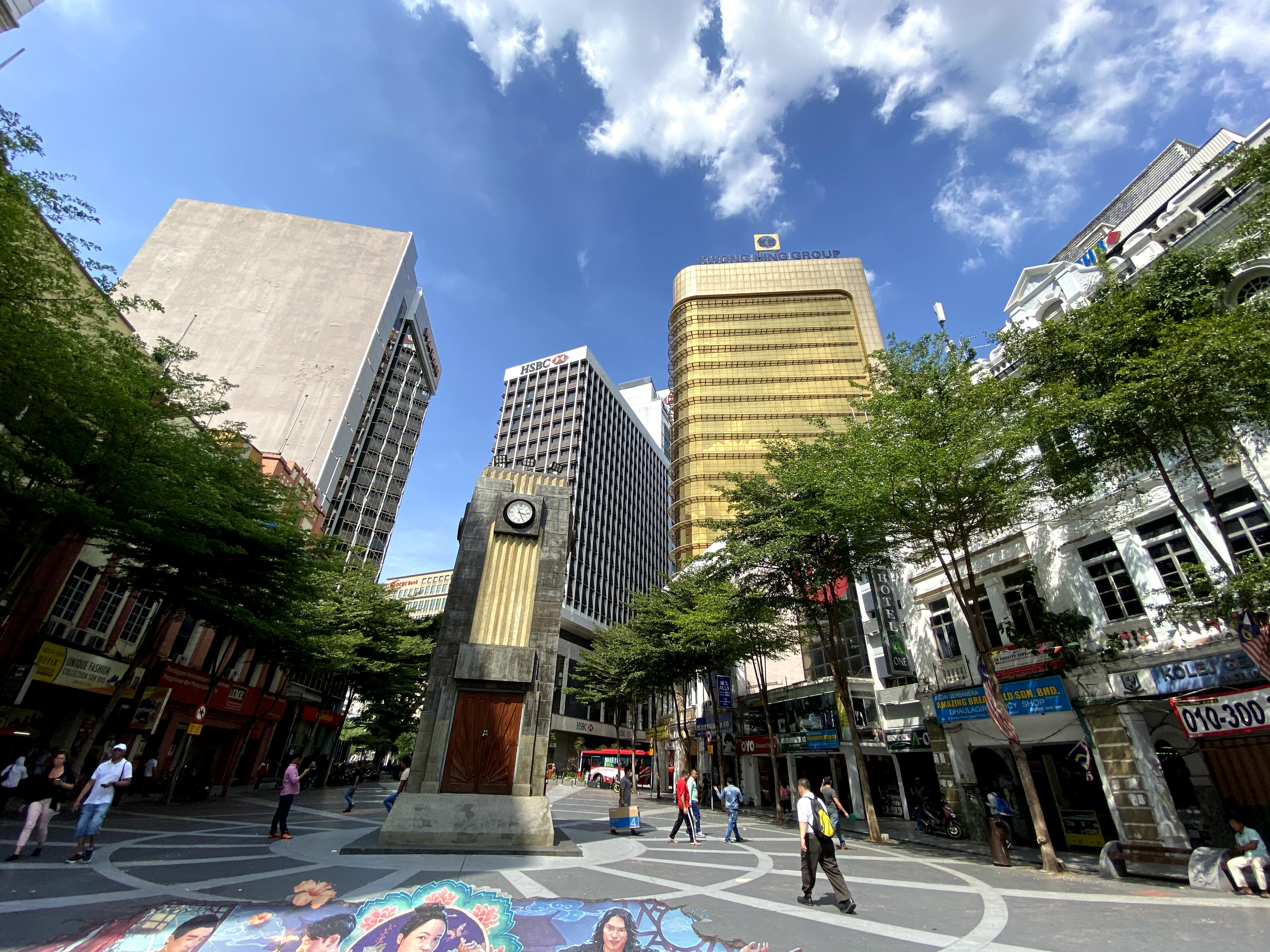
- Medan Pasar (Old Market Square)
  Medan Pasar

== Religious places ==
=== Buddhist temples ===
- Buddhist Maha Vihara
- Sri Lanka Buddhist Temple, Sentul

=== Chinese temples ===
- Sin Sze Si Ya Temple
- Thean Hou Temple

=== Churches ===
- St. John's Cathedral
- St. Mary's Cathedral

=== Hindu temples ===
- Sri Kandaswamy Kovil
- Sri Mahamariamman Temple

=== Mosques ===
- Federal Territory Mosque
- Jamek Mosque
- National Mosque of Malaysia

== Science centres ==
- National Planetarium
- National Science Centre

== Shopping centres ==
- AEON-Maluri
- Berjaya Times Square
- Bukit Bintang
- Central Market
- Fahrenheit 88
- LaLaport Bukit Bintang City Centre
- Lot 10
- Low Yat Plaza
- Sunway Putra Mall
- Mid Valley Megamall
- Pavilion Kuala Lumpur
- Quill City Mall
- Starhill Gallery
- Sungei Wang Plaza
- Sunway Velocity Mall
- Suria KLCC
- The Gardens Mall

== Skyscrapers ==
- Petronas Twin Towers
- Merdeka 118
- The Exchange 106

== Sport centres ==
- National Sports Complex
- Stadium Merdeka
- Chin Woo Stadium
- Axiata Arena

== Theme parks ==
- Berjaya Times Square Theme Park

== Towers ==
- Kuala Lumpur Tower

== Transportation ==
- Kuala Lumpur Railway Station

== Zoo ==
- Aquaria KLCC
- Kuala Lumpur Bird Park
- Kuala Lumpur Butterfly Park

== See also ==
- List of tourist attractions in Malaysia
