= Mulia =

Mulia may refer to:

== Places and jurisdictions ==
- Mulia, Numidia, an Ancient city and former bishopric in Numidia, now El-Milia in Algeria and a Latin Catholic titular see
- Mulia, Puncak Jaya, the capital of Puncak Jaya Regency, Indonesia
- Kampung Sungai Mulia, a village in Malaysia

== Persons ==
- Mulia (surname) (Malay linguistic family)
- Duli Yang Maha Mulia, a royal title in Malaysia, equivalent to His Royal Highness

== Others ==
- Real Mulia F.C., a Malaysian football club
- Seri Mulia Sarjana School in Brunei
- University of Bunda Mulia in Indonesia
- Mulia Group, an Indonesian company
