= Balang =

Balang may refer to:

- Balang Formation, a Cambrian Period geological formation, which outcrops in western Hunan and eastern Guizhou in southern China
- Balang, Indonesia, a village in North Sulawesi province
- Balang Township, one of the township-level divisions of Jilin province, China
- John Philip Bughaw (born 2008), a Filipino teenaged dancer and actor popularly known as Balang
- Mafry Balang (born 1984), a Malaysian footballer
- Rubin Balang, a Malaysian politician

== See also ==
- Kampung Padang Balang, the oldest surviving traditional village in Kuala Lumpur, Malaysia
- Sungai Balang, a mukim in Muar District, Johor, Malaysia
