= Kampung Sungai Mulia =

Coordinates: 3.212819°N 101.704645°E

Kampung Sungai Mulia or simply Sungai Mulia is a village located along the 4th Mile Jalan Gombak. It is located in the town of Gombak on the Kuala Lumpur side.

Neighbouring places are Kampung Kerdas, Kampung Padang Balang, and Taman Setapak.

== See also ==
- Kampung Padang Balang
