= Kuala Lumpur Bird Park =

Aviary in Malaysia

Kuala Lumpur Bird Park Taman Burung Kuala Lumpur
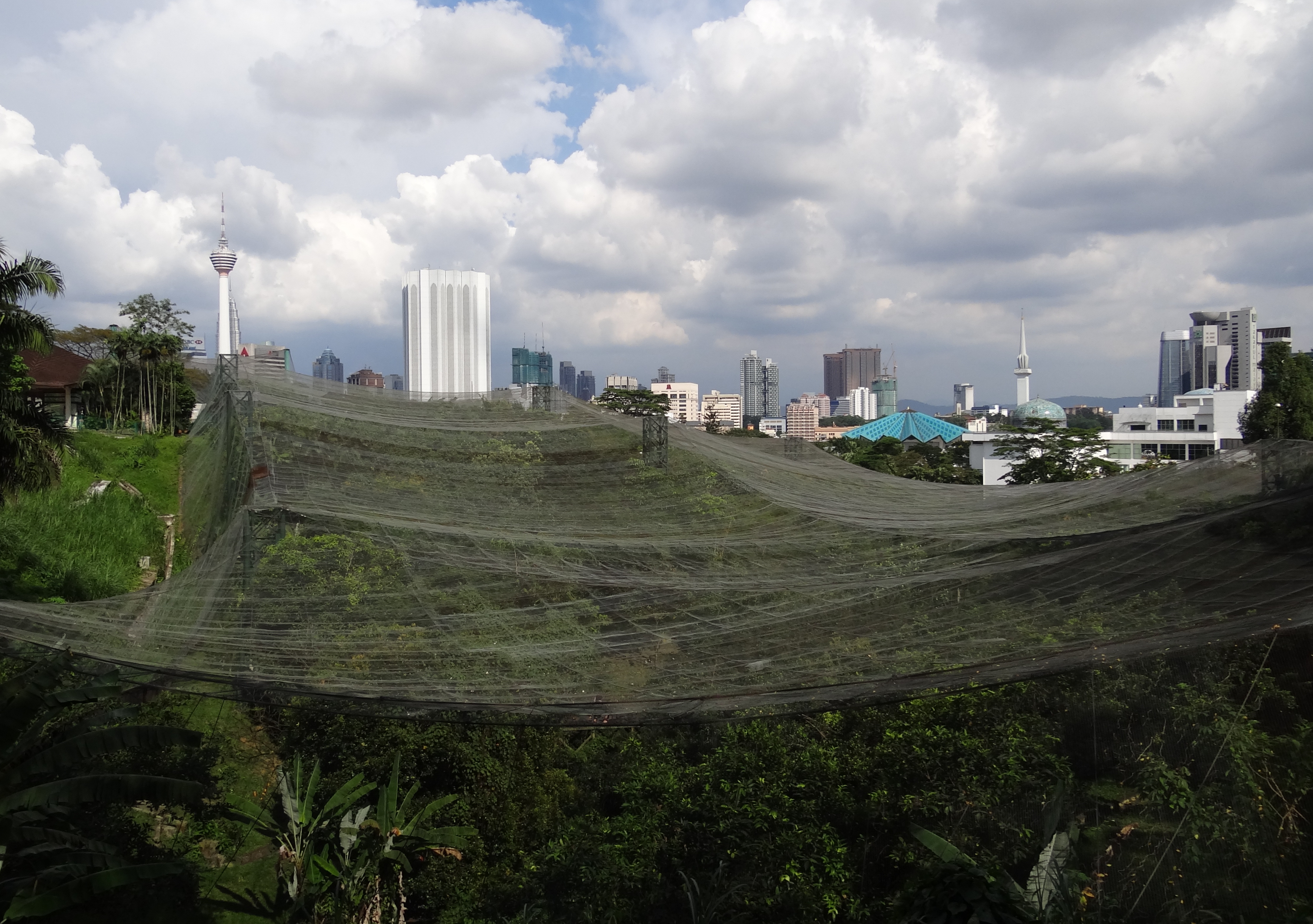
- Seen from the west towards the city centre
- Interactive map of Kuala Lumpur Bird Park; Taman Burung Kuala Lumpur
- 3.1424337°N 101.6884661°E
- Date opened: 15 November 1991; 34 years ago
- Location: Kuala Lumpur, Malaysia
- Land area: 20.9 acres (8.5 ha)
- No. of animals: 3,000
- No. of species: 200
- Annual visitors: 200,000
- Website: klbirdpark.com

Kuala Lumpur Bird Park (Malay: Taman Burung Kuala Lumpur) is a 20.9-acre (8.5 ha) public aviary in the Malaysian capital of Kuala Lumpur. It is one of the world's largest covered bird parks, located adjacent to the 60-hectare (150-acre) Perdana Botanical Gardens, Kuala Lumpur Butterfly Park, the National Mosque, and the Royal Malaysian Police Museum. The park houses more than 3,000 birds, representing over 200 species in an enclosed aviary. About 90% are local birds and 10% were imported from countries such as Australia, China, the Netherlands, Indonesia, Papua New Guinea, Tanzania, and Thailand.

== History ==
The bird park was first planned in 1987. Being in a fenced area with a netted canopy, implementation began the following year.

In its early years, the park was criticised for dirty toilets, "rubbish-strewn paths and the lack of information signs". By the year 2000, it had become "landscaped, clean and shady".

== Image gallery ==
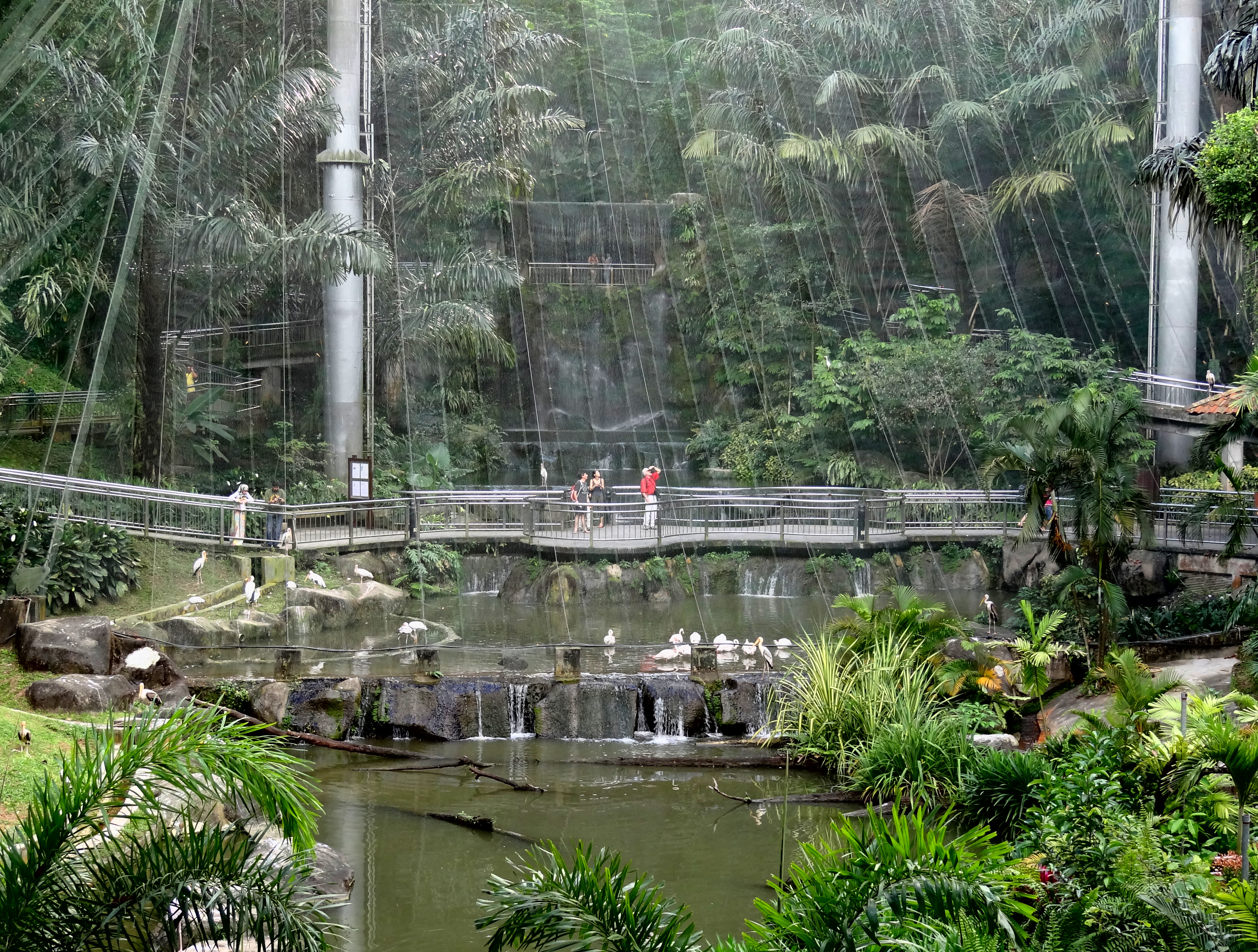
Internal view of the bird park

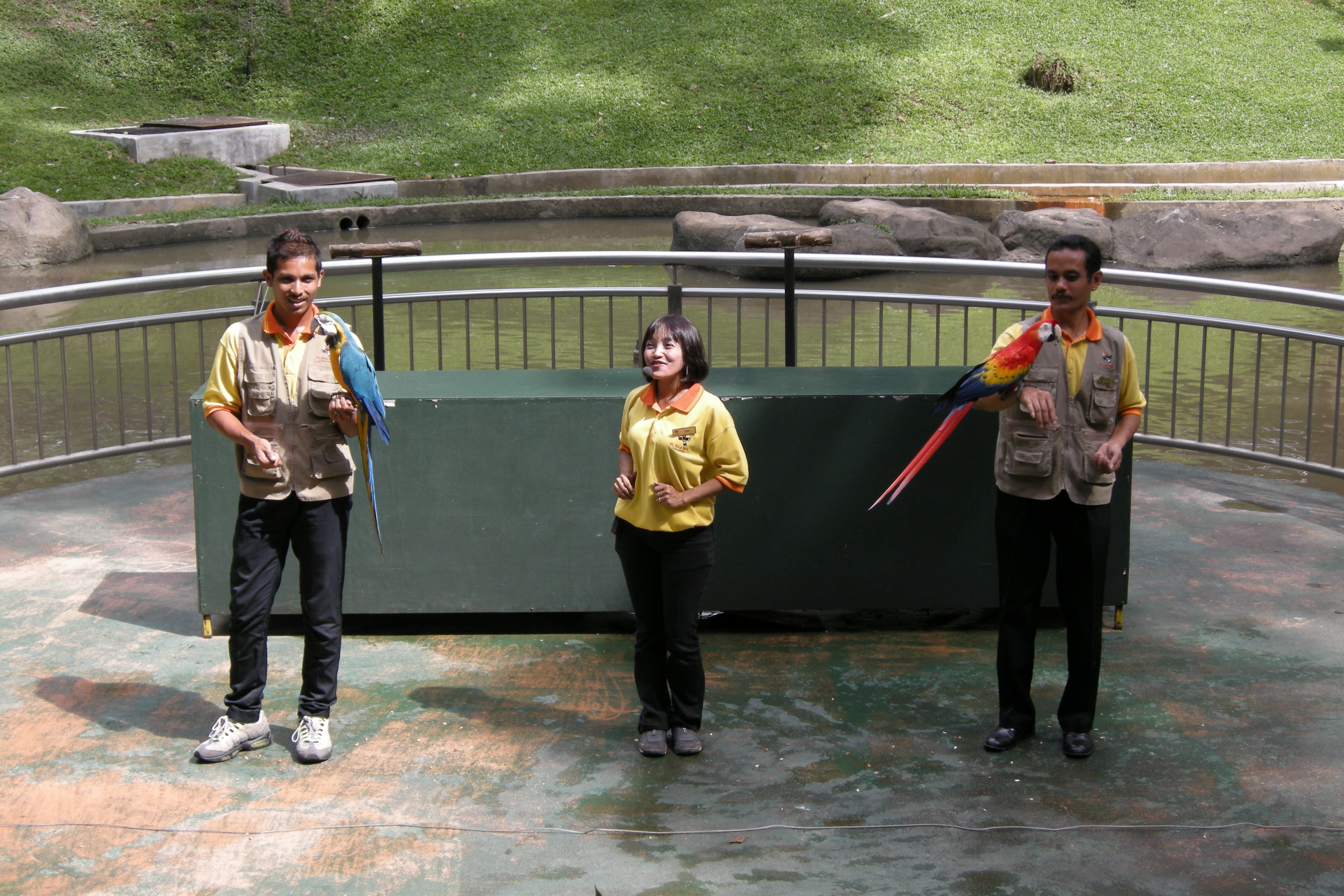
Performance

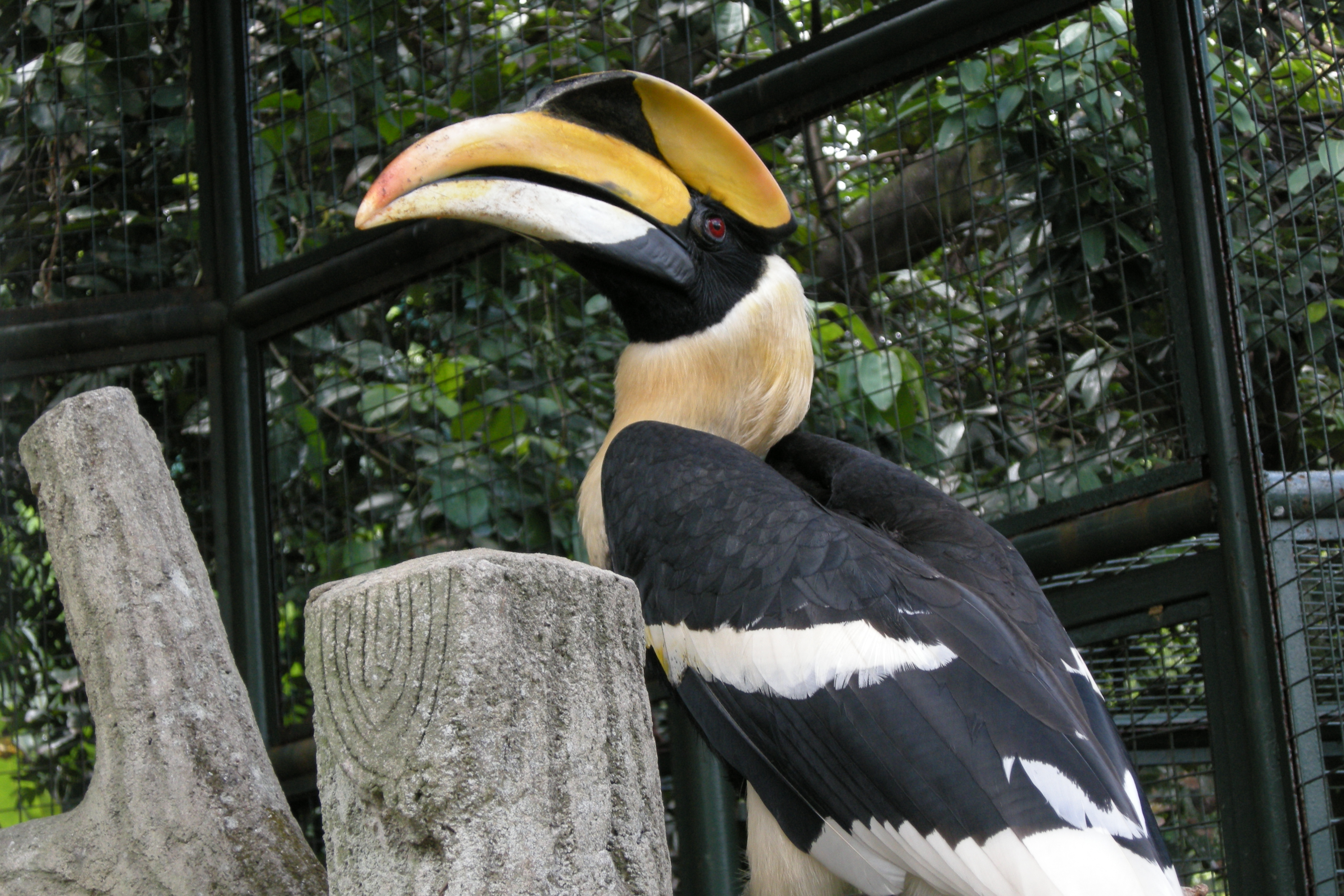
Great hornbill

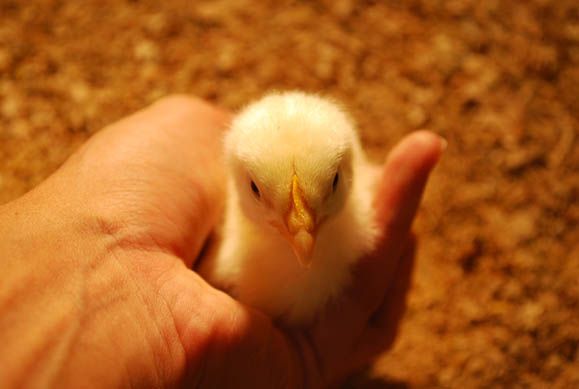
A chick in the education centre

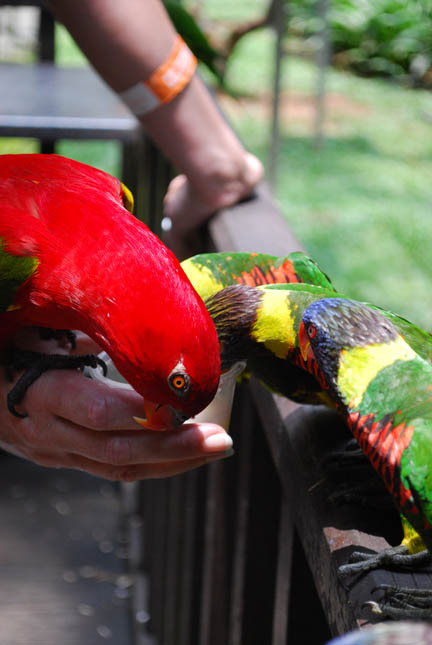
Feeding time for rainbow lorikeets and a red lory

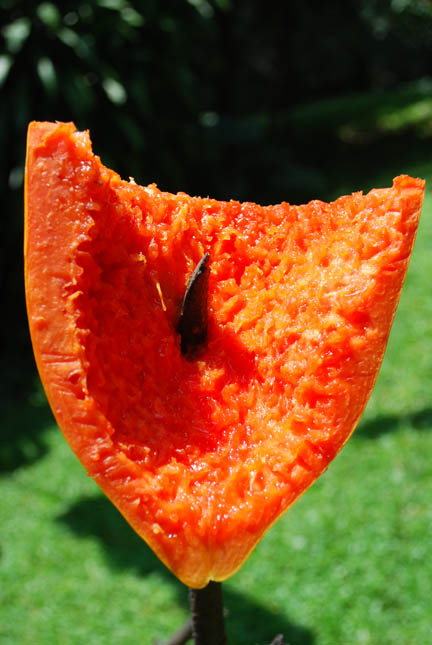
A slice of papaya for birds

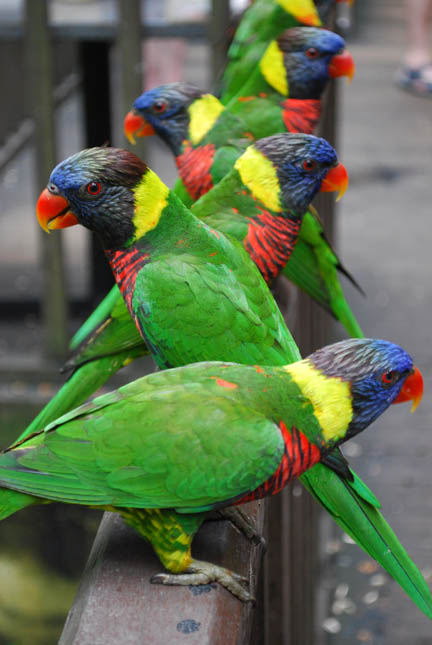
Rainbow lorikeets

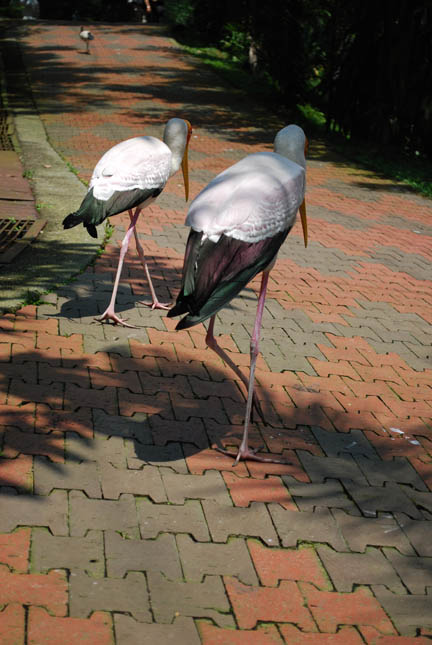
Milky storks

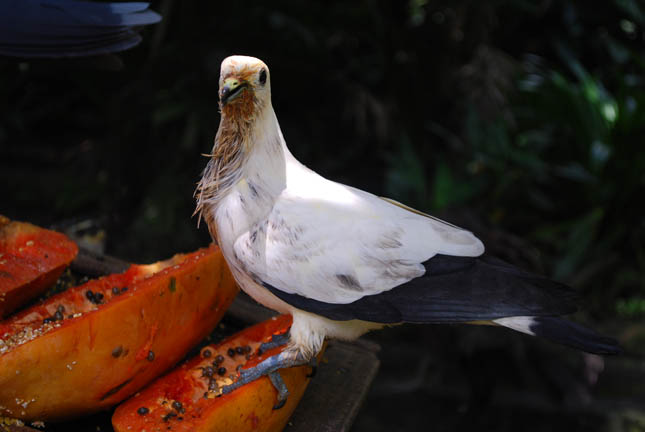
A bird feeding on a piece of papaya

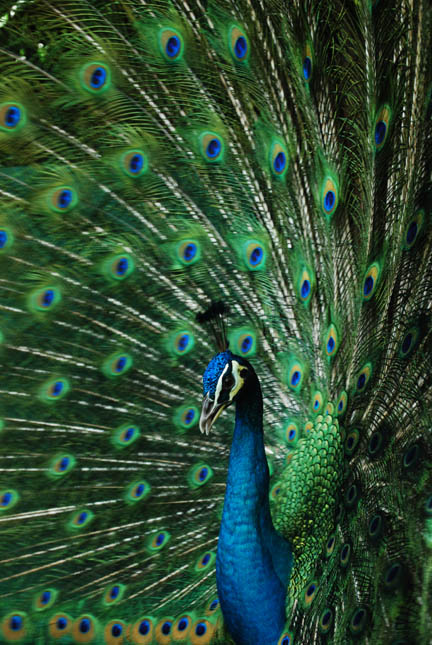
A peacock in the park

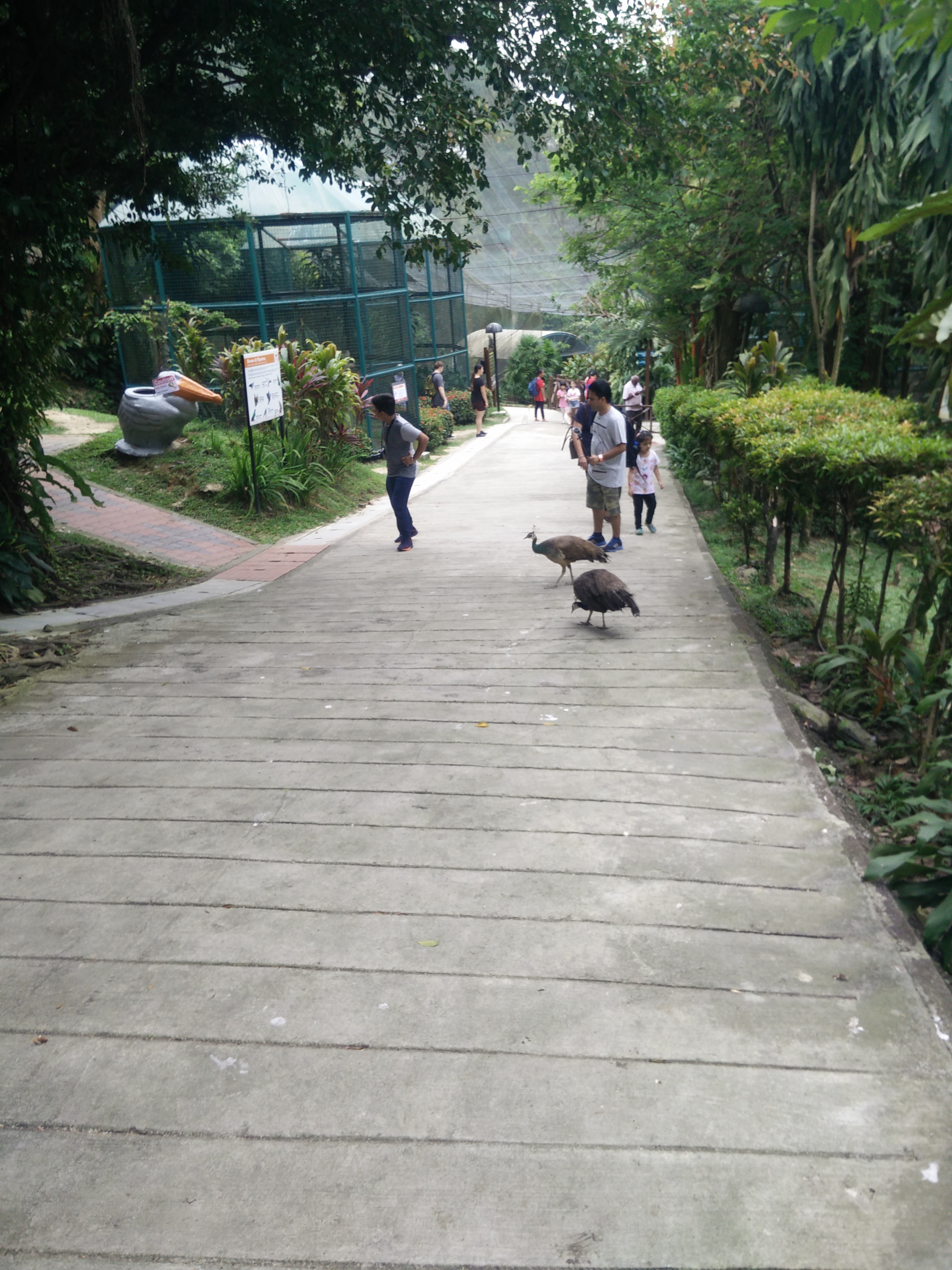
A view near the park entrance

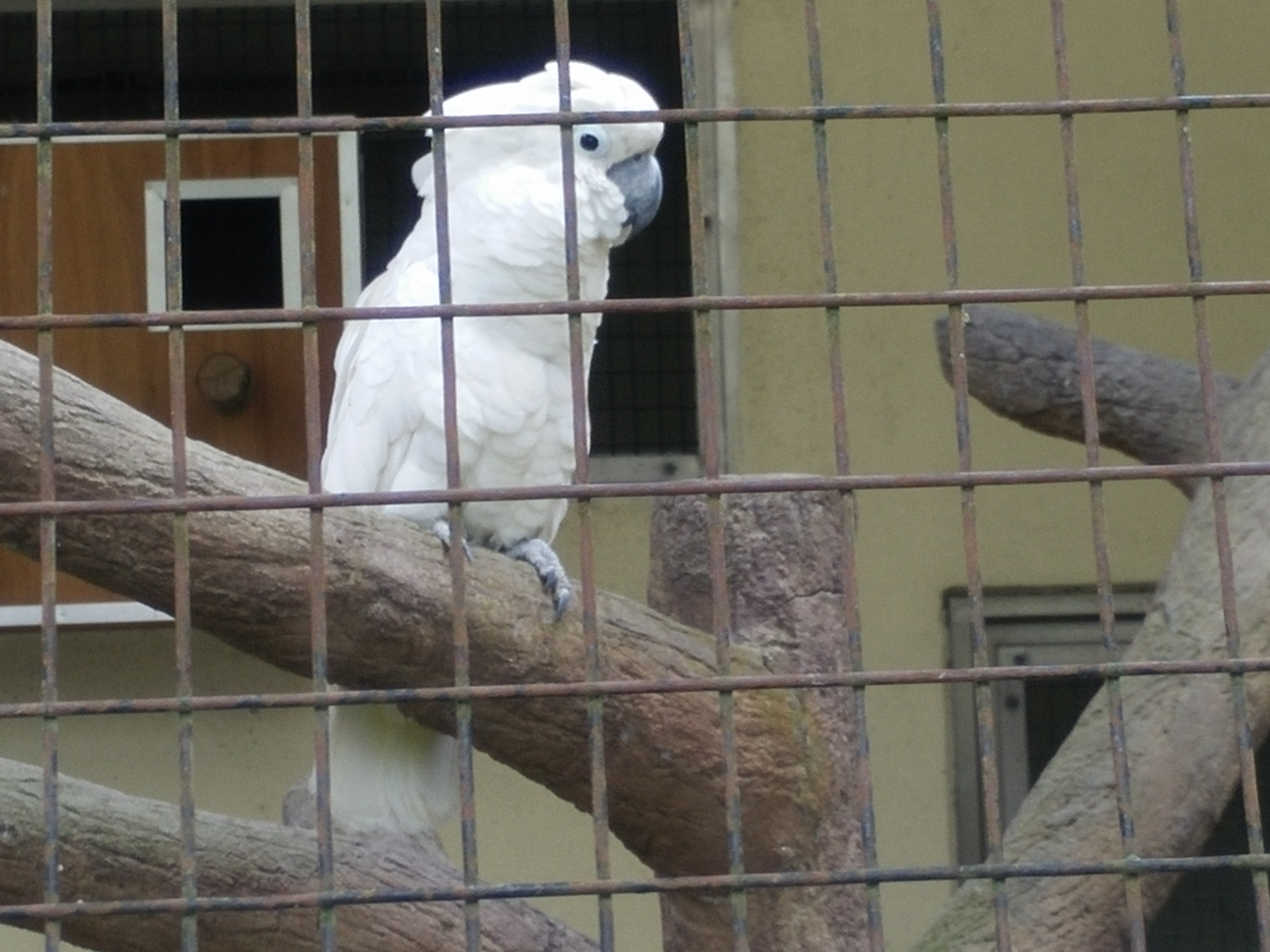
A white parrot

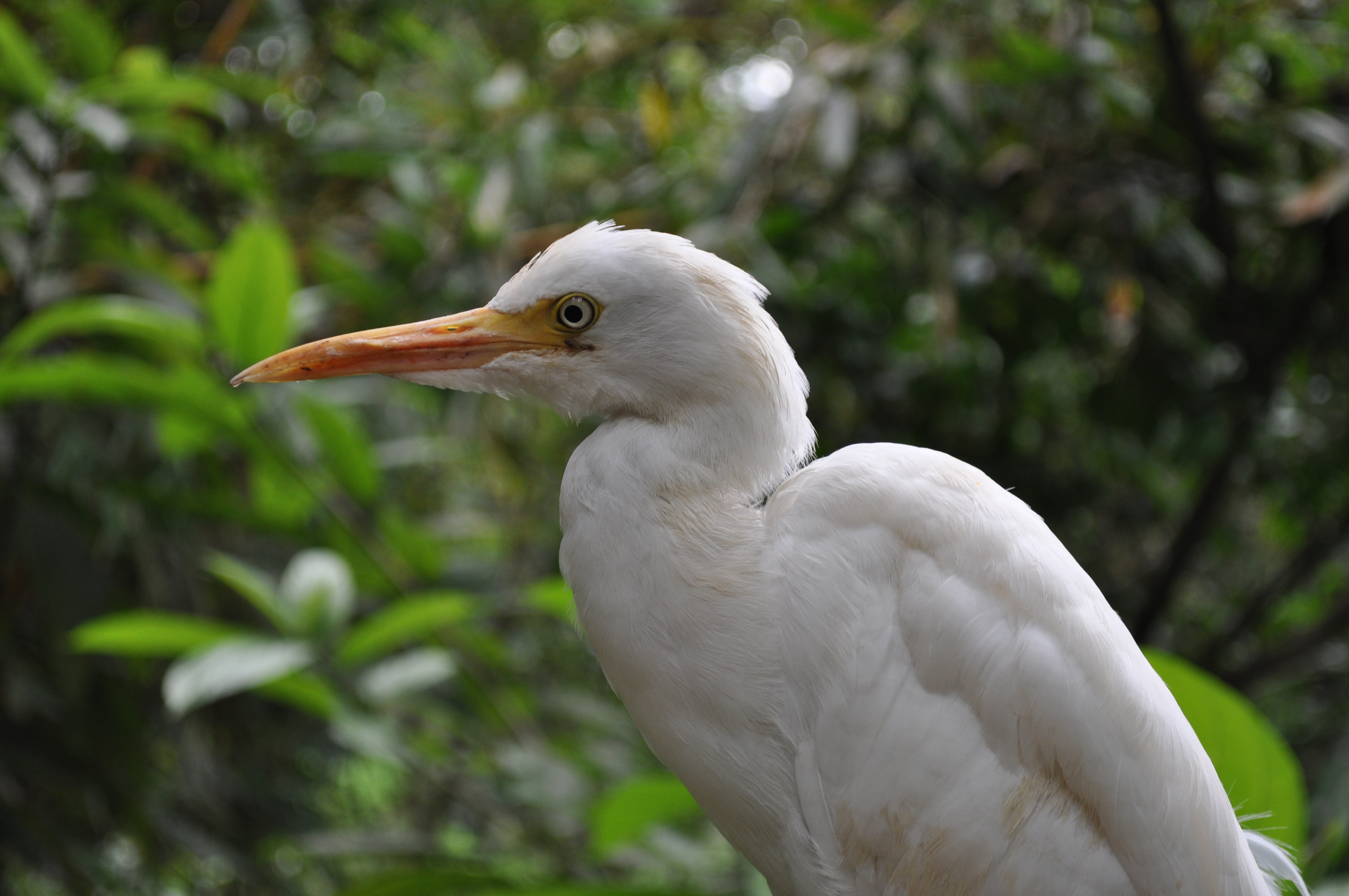
An egret

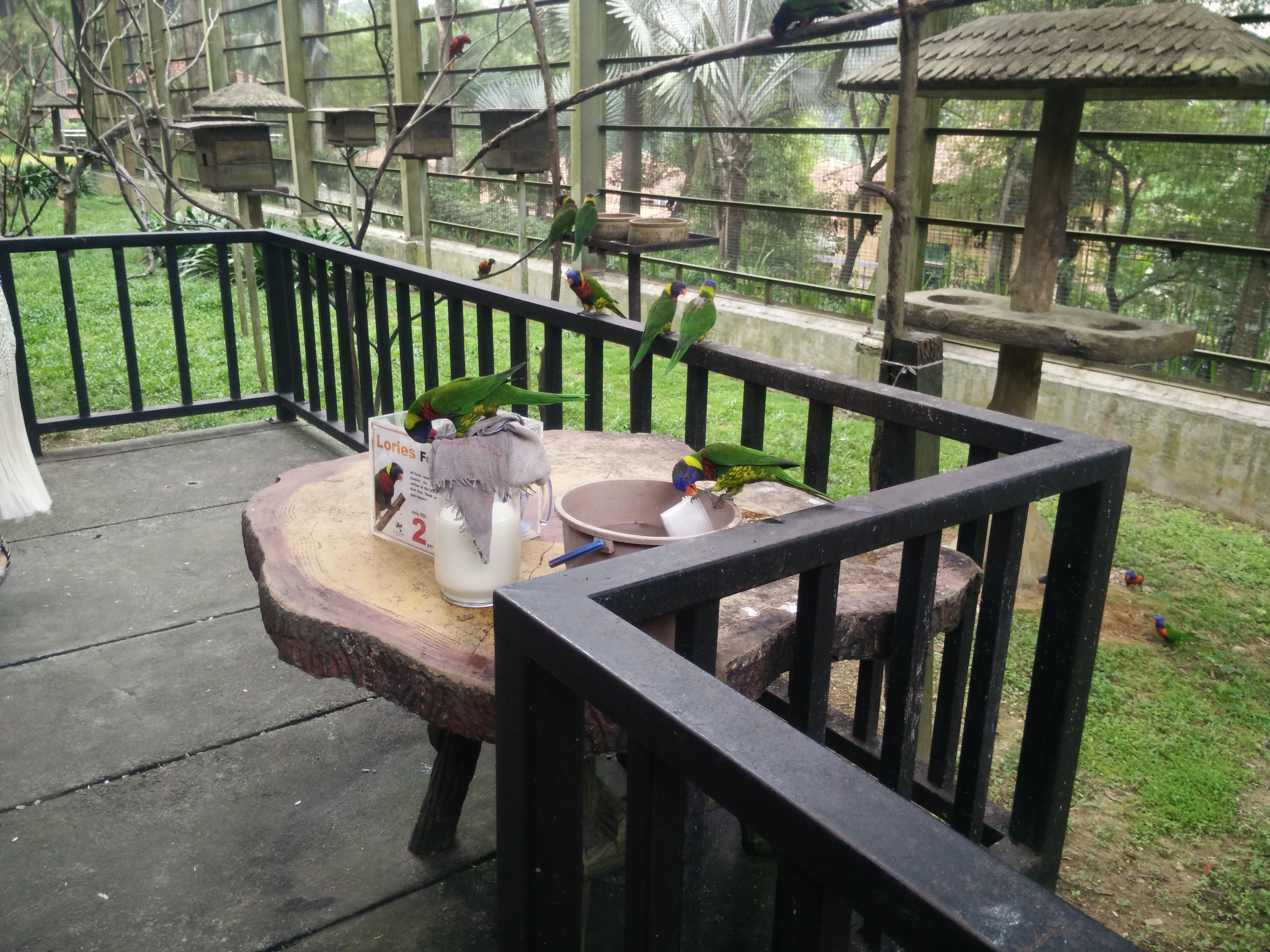
Seating at the park

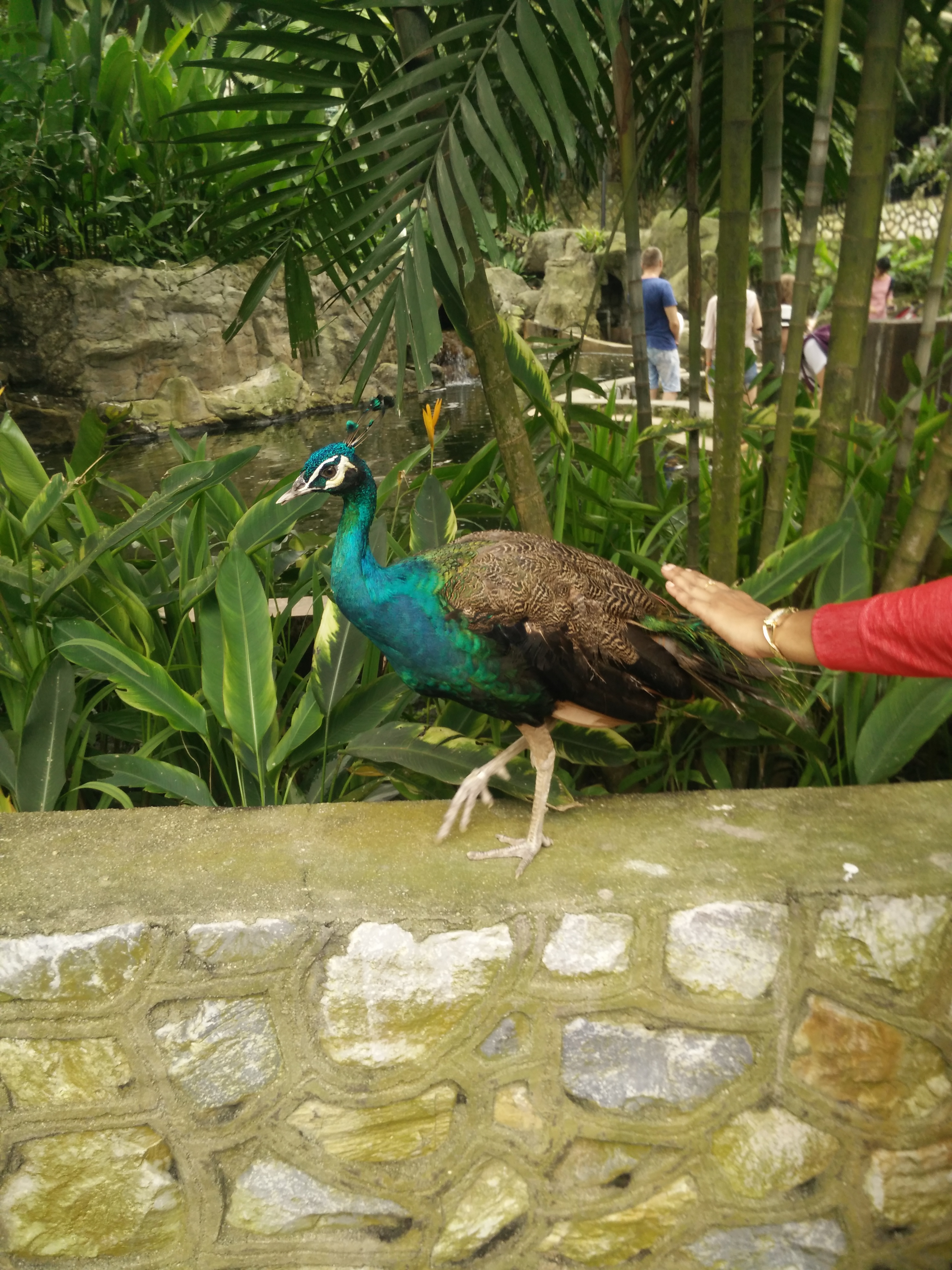
A peacock

== See also ==
- National Zoo of Malaysia
