= Mulia (surname) =

Mulia is a Southeast Asian surname. Notable people with the surname include:

- Jonathan Mulia (born 1986), Indonesian actor
- Pandikar Amin Mulia, Malaysian politician
- Shinta Mulia Sari (born 1988), Indonesian-born Singaporean badminton player
- Siti Musdah Mulia, Indonesian women's rights activist
