= National Planetarium =

- Planetarium Negara

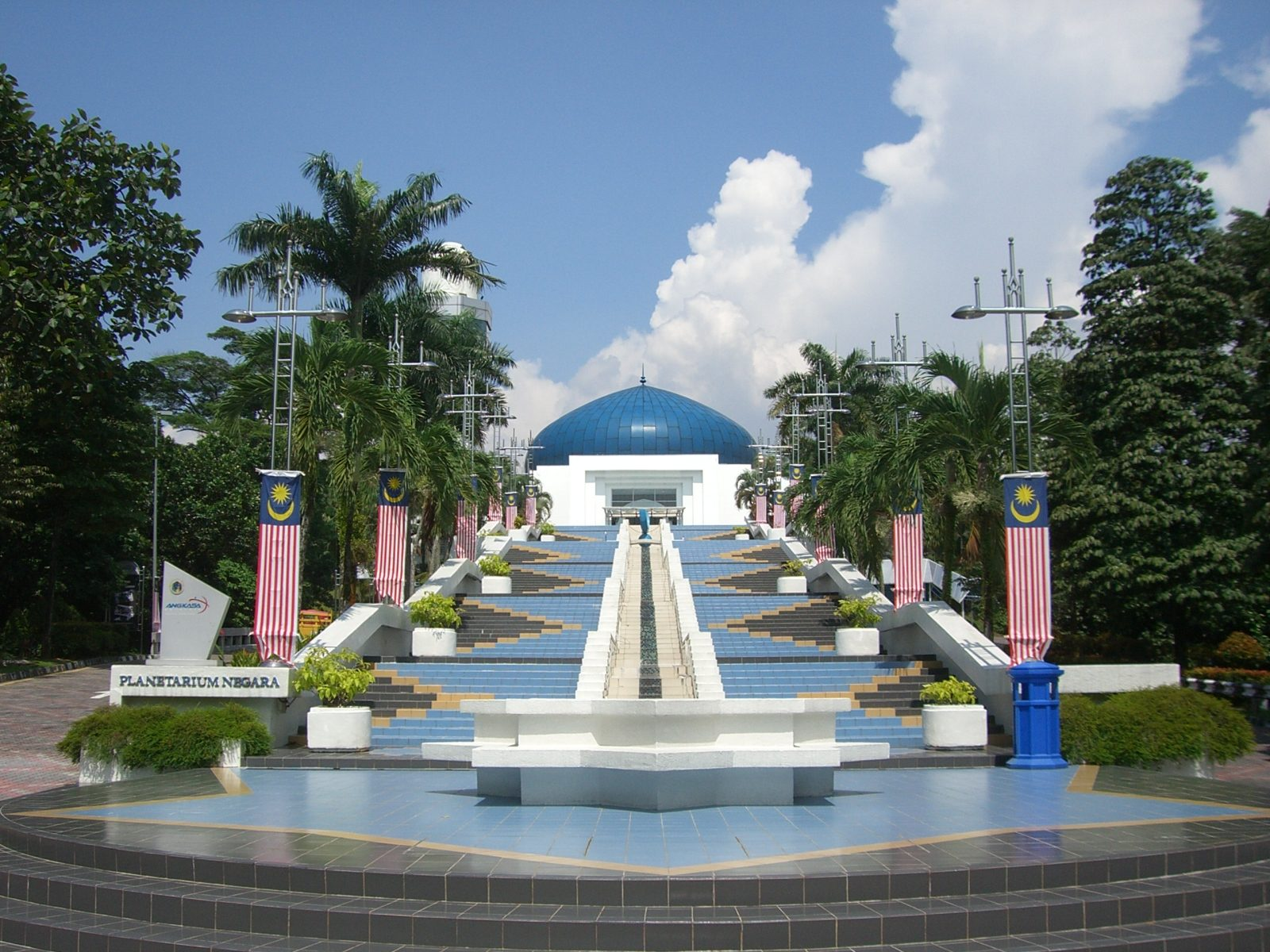
- Main entrance of the National Planetarium
- Established: 1993; 33 years ago
- Location: Jalan Perdana, Tasik Perdana, 50480 Kuala Lumpur, Malaysia
- Coordinates: 3°8′22.08″N 101°41′21.73″E
- Type: Science museum
- Owner: Ministry of Science, Technology and Innovation
- Website: planetariumnegara.gov.my

The National Planetarium (Malay: Planetarium Negara) is the national planetarium of Malaysia. It is a blue-domed structure that is situated on top of a hill in the Lake Gardens at Jalan Perdana, Kuala Lumpur. It is about 120,000 square feet (11,000 m^{2}) in area.

== History ==
The National Planetarium started as the Planetarium Division in the Prime Minister's Department in 1989. The construction of the National Planetarium complex, then only known as the National Space and Science Education Centre, began in 1990 and was completed in 1993, costing RM 24 million with the Japanese government donating RM 5 million to the total construction cost. A soft launch to the public began in May 1993 and it was officially opened by the Prime Minister of Malaysia, Mahathir Mohamad, on 7 February 1994. In July 1995, the Division was transferred to the Ministry of Science, Technology and the Environment, which is also the owner of this planetarium until now.

== Exhibits and attractions ==
One of the major attractions of this planetarium includes a space theatre which screens space shows and large format film.

In the main hall are permanent exhibits related to space science. Among them is Arianne IV space engine, which is also one of the engines used to launch MEASAT 1, Malaysia's first satellite into space. A 14-inch (360 mm) telescope is located in the observatory.

The National Planetarium extends to a space theme park where replicas of ancient observatories are sited. It is connected by an overhead pedestrian bridge to the National Museum of Malaysia.

== Operating hours ==
The planetarium is opened daily from 9.00 am to 4.30 pm (except on Monday, Hari Raya Puasa holiday, Hari Raya Haji holiday and public holidays as stated by the Planetarium Negara). The planetarium shows will be aired every one hour starting at 10am and the last show will be at 4pm. The entrance to the gallery is free and the shows ticket is RM 12 for adult (per person) and RM 8 for children (per person).

== Transportation ==
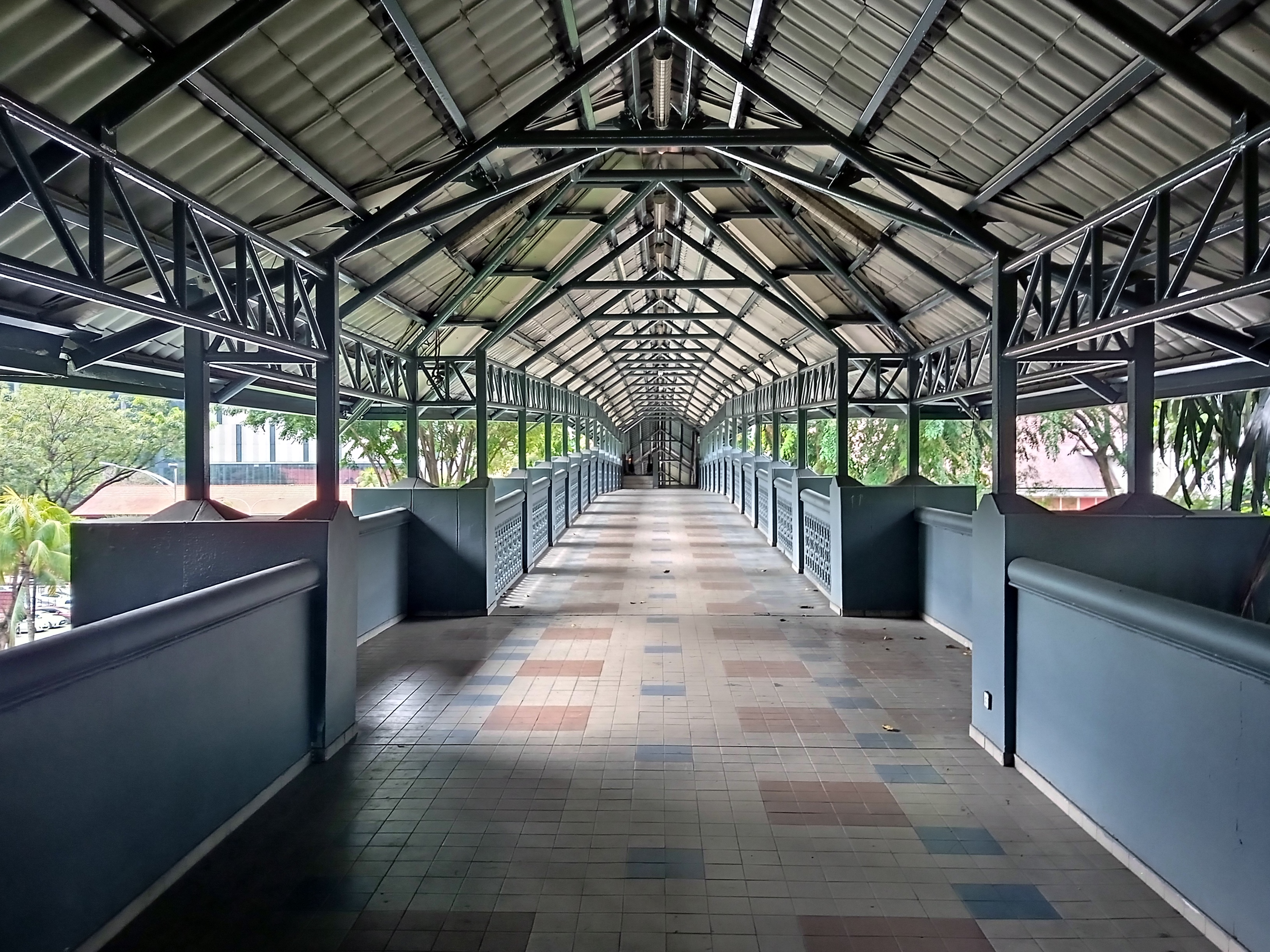
The linkway from National Museum towards National Planetarium over Jalan Damansara

The planetarium is accessible within walking distance west of Kuala Lumpur railway station.

It is also accessible through a pedestrian overhead bridge from the National Museum.
