= Balang, Indonesia =

Balang
- Location in North Sulawesi and Indonesia Balang (Indonesia)
- Coordinates: 3°54′56.2284″N 126°40′42.6792″E
- Country: Indonesia
- Province: North Sulawesi
- Regency: Talaud Islands Regency
- District: Salibabu District
- Elevation: 535 ft (163 m)

Population (2010)
  - Total: 592
- Time zone: UTC+8 (Indonesia Central Standard Time)

Balang is an Indonesian village in Salibabu district, Talaud Islands Regency in North Sulawesi province. Its population is 592.

== Climate ==
Balang has a tropical rainforest climate (Af) with heavy to very heavy rainfall year-round.

Climate data for Balang
Month	Jan	Feb	Mar	Apr	May	Jun	Jul	Aug	Sep	Oct	Nov	Dec	Year
Mean daily maximum °C (°F)	29.8 (85.6)	29.9 (85.8)	30.2 (86.4)	31.0 (87.8)	30.5 (86.9)	30.0 (86.0)	29.8 (85.6)	30.4 (86.7)	30.7 (87.3)	30.9 (87.6)	30.8 (87.4)	30.2 (86.4)	30.4 (86.6)
Daily mean °C (°F)	25.5 (77.9)	25.5 (77.9)	25.7 (78.3)	26.4 (79.5)	26.2 (79.2)	25.8 (78.4)	25.6 (78.1)	26.0 (78.8)	26.1 (79.0)	26.3 (79.3)	26.3 (79.3)	25.9 (78.6)	25.9 (78.7)
Mean daily minimum °C (°F)	21.2 (70.2)	21.2 (70.2)	21.3 (70.3)	21.8 (71.2)	22.0 (71.6)	21.7 (71.1)	21.4 (70.5)	21.7 (71.1)	21.6 (70.9)	21.8 (71.2)	21.8 (71.2)	21.7 (71.1)	21.6 (70.9)
Average precipitation mm (inches)	339 (13.3)	215 (8.5)	272 (10.7)	245 (9.6)	309 (12.2)	311 (12.2)	280 (11.0)	209 (8.2)	211 (8.3)	243 (9.6)	296 (11.7)	314 (12.4)	3,244 (127.7)
Source: Climate-Data.org
