= Kampung Kerdas =

Kerdas Village Kampung Kerdas
- Village
- Entrance to Kampung Kerdas
- Interactive map of Kerdas Village
- Coordinates: 3°13′24″N 101°42′40″E
- Country: Malaysia
- State: Selangor
- District: Gombak

Kampung Kerdas is a village located in Gombak, Selangor, Malaysia.

Kampung Kerdas is situated alongside Jalan Gombak. Nearby areas neighbouring this village are Kampung Changkat, Taman Kamariah, and Taman Gombak Jaya.

== See also ==
- Kampung Padang Balang
