= Kuala Lumpur Butterfly Park =

Butterfly zoo in Kuala Lumpur, Malaysia

Kuala Lumpur Butterfly Park Taman Rama Rama Kuala Lumpur
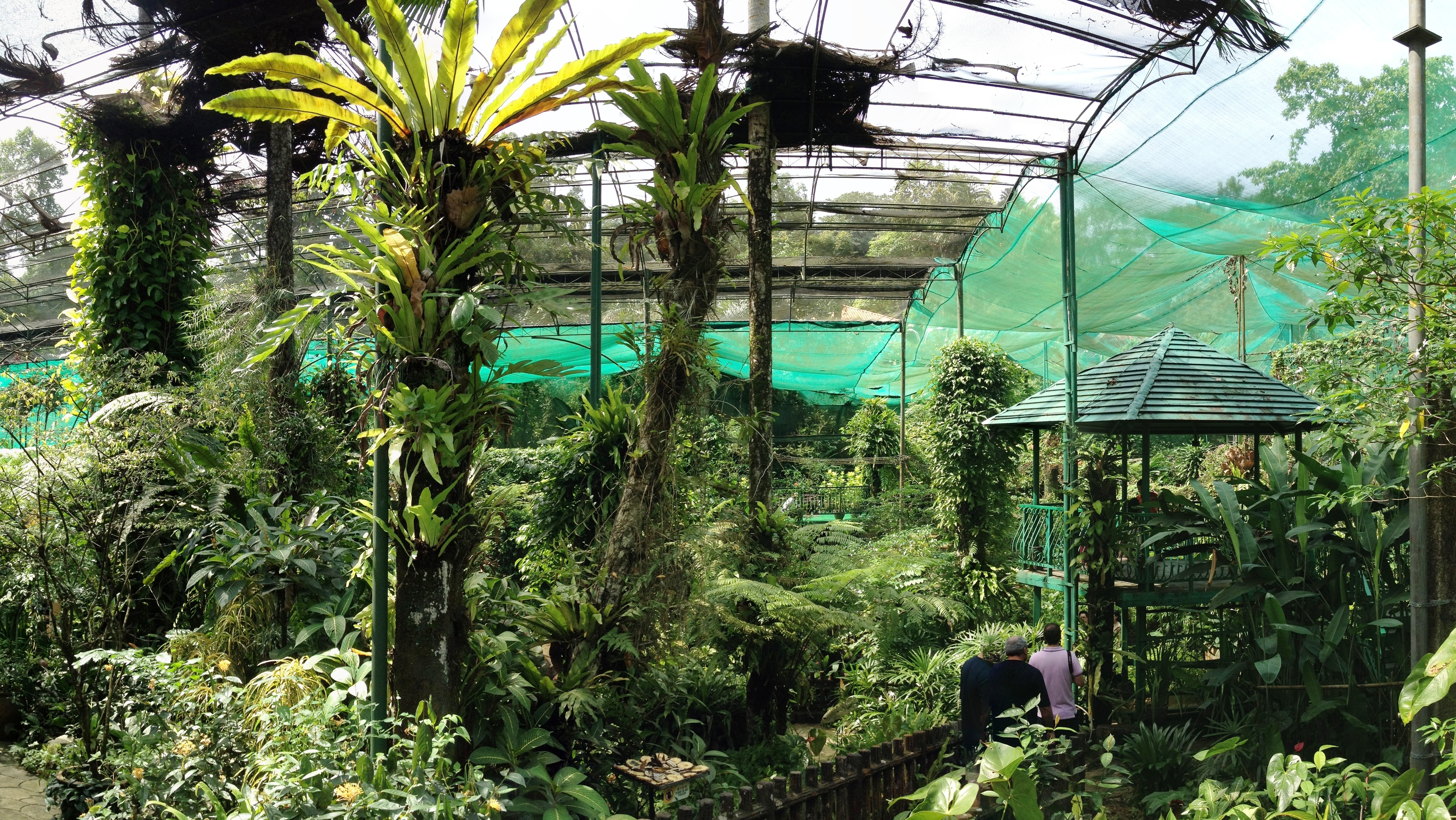
- Interactive map of Kuala Lumpur Butterfly Park; Taman Rama Rama Kuala Lumpur
- 3.145733°N 101.688906°E
- Date opening: 1992
- Location: Kuala Lumpur, Malaysia
- Land area: 80,000 sq ft (7,400 m^{2})
- Public transit: Pasar Seni station
- Website: klbutterflypark.com

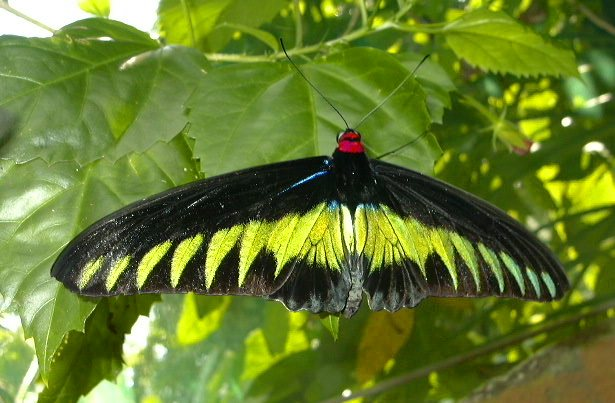
Rajah Brooke's birdwing, the national butterfly of Malaysia, at KL Butterfly Park

Kuala Lumpur Butterfly Park (Malay: Taman Rama Rama Kuala Lumpur) is a large public butterfly zoo in Kuala Lumpur, Malaysia. It is a popular tourist attraction in the country, as well as one of the largest such houses in the world, spanning over an area 80,000 sq ft (7,400 m^{2}) of land and located adjacent to the Lake Gardens and Kuala Lumpur Bird Park.

The park exhibits over 5,000 butterflies (many of which are local to the country), as well as insects, exotic plants, butterfly-host plants and ferns. It also houses an exhibition area with information on butterflies and other insects, and offers a souvenir store for tourists at the end of the tour.
