= Kampung Padang Balang =

Traditional village in Malaysia

- Malay Traditional Village in Federal Territory (Malaysia)
- Padang Balang Malay Traditional Village
- Flag Seal
- Motto: Tuah Sakato
- Location within Malaysia Location within Asia
- Coordinates: 3°12′45.551″N 101°41′53.93″E
- Country: Malaysia
- State: Federal Territory (Malaysia)
- City: Kuala Lumpur
- Metropolis: Klang Valley
- District: Setapak
- Constituency: Wangsa Maju
- Local Authority: Kuala Lumpur City Hall
- Establishment: 1830
- Founder: Datuk Ampat Balang Batang Kapas
- Original settlers: Batang Kapas, Payakumbuh, Kuantan, Biduanda Temuan

Government
  - Type: Constitutional Democracy
  - Regent: Sultan Ibrahim
  - Premier: Dato Seri Anwar Ibrahim
  - Minister: Dr Zaliha Mustafa
  - Mayor: Mayor Kamarulzaman Mat Salleh
  - Headman: Vacant
- Time zone: UTC+8 (MST)
- Postcode: 51100 Kuala Lumpur
- Police: Sentul District Police Headquarters
- Fire: South Gombak Fire and Rescue Station

Kampung Padang Balang or Padang Balang is the oldest surviving traditional village in Kuala Lumpur, Malaysia. It is circumferenced by Gombak Road, Jalan Kampung Bandar Dalam, Duta–Ulu Klang Expressway (DUKE), Kuala Lumpur Middle Ring Road 2 and Gombak River.

== History ==
The first settler in Padang Balang was Datuk Balang, a Minang Datuk Ampat, (Note: Minang has quadriple organization structure, thus the chief headman was nicked as Datuk Ampat, translated as Lord of Four.) who around 1820 to 1830 led a group of Batang Kapas refugee from Minangkabau, fleeing Dutch Invasion. They first landed at Sungai Ujong. Around the late 1820s Datuk Balang and his Batang Kapas followers, as well as a number of Payakumbuh peoples from Negeri Sembilan, move north to Kelang to open a new settlement at the northern Ulu Kelang (Kuala Lumpur), now known as Gombak. Padang Balang became the first settlement in Gombak, Kuala Lumpur opened in 1830 (Note: There are no written account on the exact date of when Padang Balang was opened. However, based on evidence and narrative account, Padang Balang was opened between the late 1820s to early 1830s during and post the second half of Padri War that resulted in the fall of Minangkabau Kingdom and Dutch occupation of West Sumatra. Datuk Balang arrival set a precedence to more Batang Kapas people settling in Gombak). Datuk Balang was followed by the other group led by Datuk Sati, Datuk Samang and Datuk Jahan who also belong to Batang Kapas tribe. Soon the Batang Kapas groups were joined by tribe from the other part of Minangkabau especially the Kuantan peoples.

The new settlement was named Padang Balang after Datuk Balang. Padang means even 'field' referring to the geography of Padang Balang that is flat and wide earth surrounded by Titiwangsa mountain. Balang in Datuk Balang name come from Minang nickname for tiger means 'stripe'. Balang was also the ancient Malay honorific title for the general of the army or nobleman.

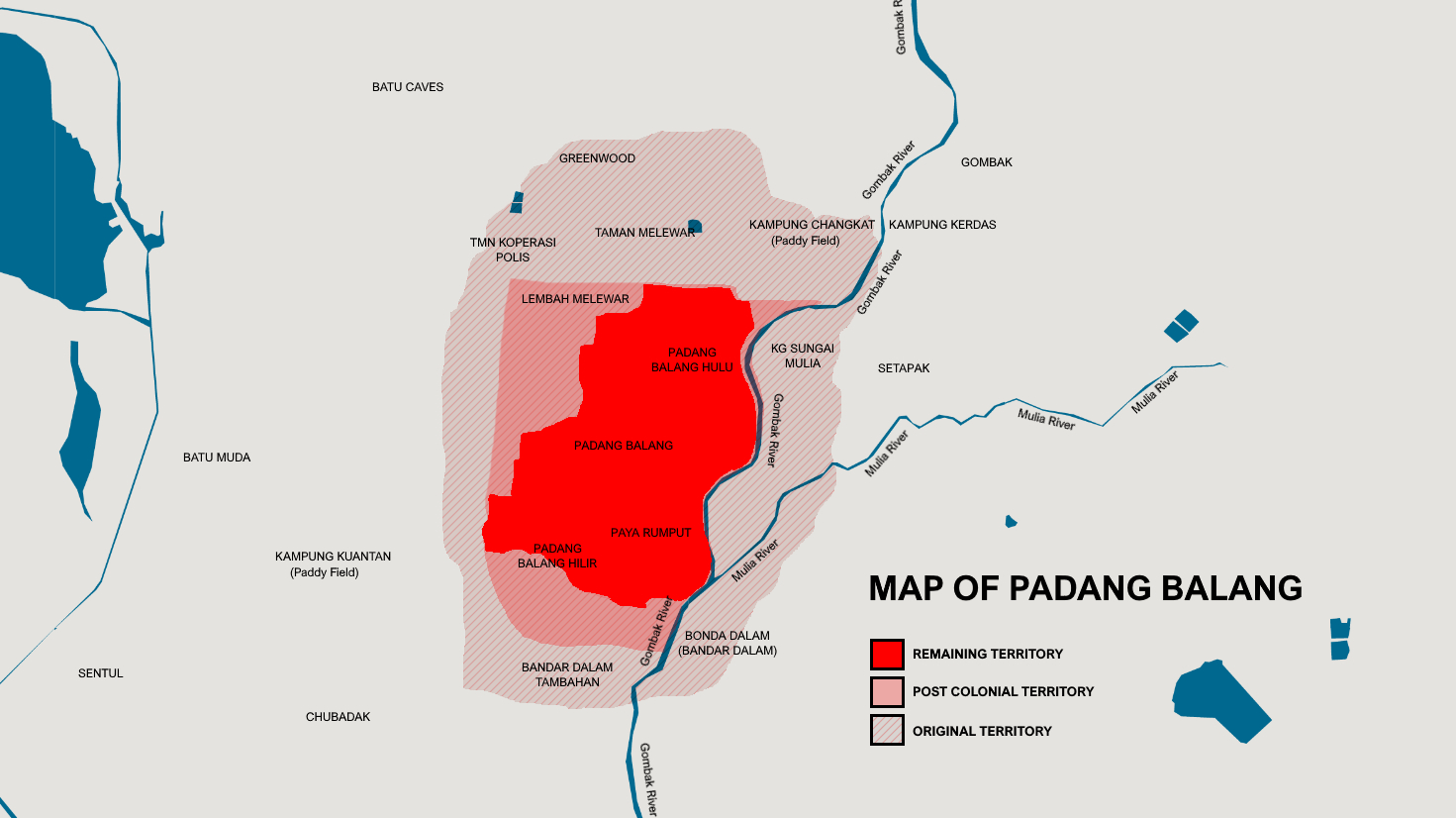

Formerly, Padang Balang was a collection of many Minangkabau villages at Gombak. In the past, it was also known as Segambut (from Minang's dialect of Sri Rambut). However, Segambut today has no relation to the original Segambut at Padang Balang. Padang Balang territory also used to include what are now the neighboring villages of Kampung Kerdas, Kampung Sungai Mulia, Kampung Changkat, Kampung Lembah Melewar, Taman Melewar, Greenwood, Kampung Chubadak, Kampung Lee Kong Chian, Taman Pelangi, Kampung Batu Muda and Kampung Bandar Dalam. Due to the rapid growth of population post the 'Ages of Keris and Pemuras', community at the outskirt breakaway to form smaller unit to smooth out administration affair and increase village security.

The remainder of villages that make up the current Kampung Padang Balang today are Kampung Padang Balang (around Masjid Saidina Ali KW and Surau Osmaniyah), Kampung Padang Balang Hulu (around Surau Jumaeah), Kampung Padang Balang Hilir (around Masjid Jamek Padang Balang) and Kampung Paya Rumput (at the current night market and Tahfiz Darul Furqan).

== Governance ==
=== List of Headsman ===
No	Name	Year	Note
1	Datuk Ampat Balang	1830-1851	Founding Father of Padang Balang
2	Datuk Ampat Sati	1852-1863	Founding Father of Padang Balang
3	Datuk Ampat Samang	1863-1867	Founding Father of Padang Balang
4	Datuk Ampat Jahan	1868-1870	Founding Father of Padang Balang
5	Onyang Abdul Malik	1870-1880	
6	Datuk Ampat Binok bin Datuk Ampat Balang	1880-1990	Son of Datuk Ampat Balang
7	Datuk Ampat Fakeh Pasisia	1890	
8	Datuk Alam Merah Bukit Kuantan	1890-1901	
9	Datuk Ampat Salleh Pasaman	1901-1903	
10	Datuk Ampat Duamin	1903-1930	
11	Datuk Ampat Abdullah	1930-1961	During Abdullah tenureship, British government who just return right after Japan Imperial Army surrendered and communist insurgency began passed law in 1945, requiring all villages in Kuala Lumpur to appoint a headsman. Abdullah become the first headsman registered in Kuala Lumpur City Hall record.
12	Datuk Ampat Abdul Manaf bin Binok	1961-2000	Son of Datuk Ampat Binok. During Abdul Manaf tenureship, Kuala Lumpur was sold to the Federal Government to become the Capital City. Headsman office was abolished by the City Hall to erase the Selangor and Malay historical trace from Kuala Lumpur, thus Abdul Manaf become the last Datuk Ampat of Padang Balang.
-	Interregnum	2000-2018	After the demise of Abdul Manaf, the City Hall issued Draf Kuala Lumpur 2020. In the plan, Padang Balang was labelled as squatters which upset the villagers. The chairman of Masjid Saidina Ali K.A.W Hj. Zainal Abidin b. Hj. Ma’as take the lead to resist the City Hall plan.
13	Haji Rosden Bin Haji Mohd Yassin	2018-2020	Political appointment post the victory of Pakatan Harapan in General Election to reintroduce the headsman office in Kampung Padang Balang. The office was abolished again when the Pakatan Harapan government was toppled less than two years from its formation.

== Population ==
=== Demographic ===
Malay makes up the majority of the Padang Balang population. One third of them are descendants of the early Minangkabau and native born-Selangor settlers while most of the rest are settlers from other Malay states like Kedah, Pahang, Johor, Terengganu, Perak and Kelantan (as well as their Kuala Lumpur-born descendants), whilst the other remaining Malays are descendants of later immigrants from other parts of Sumatra island as well as the island of Java, both in present-day Indonesia (who also comprise a portion of the local Malay populace).

In addition, there are also a few Pakistani immigrants and Chinese settlers of Hakka and Cantonese descent.

=== Religion ===
The Padang Balang peoples are followers of Islam.

== Tourism ==
Although never gazetted as a tourist spot, its status as the oldest surviving traditional village in Kuala Lumpur has attracted many foreign tourists to Padang Balang. Among in the list is the Joker actor and 30 Second to Mars vocalist, Jared Leto.

=== Agriculture ===
Over 90% of the Padang Balang land has agricultural status. Although most of the orchard has been chopped down to give way to residential, fruit trees like durian, rambutan, and mangosteen still can be found in abundance. Many agricultural activities also take place along the Gombak rivers.

=== Nature ===
Due to its proximity to Titiwangsa Mountains, Padang Balang is a favourite location for birdwatchers. In addition to many local birds like Pegar, Wak-Wak, Puchong, Ayam-Ayam, Bangau, But-But, Burungantu (Owl), Enggang (Hornbill), honey bird, hummingbirds, etc., Padang Balang also hosts various foreign birds like flamingos and pelicans from National Zoo of Malaysia (approximately 15 km from the village).

== Sport ==
Gelanggang Tok Jenai

Gelanggang Tok Jenai is a well-known "gelanggang" or gym for Silat Gayung in Kuala Lumpur. The gym is the official Trainer training center for Silat Gayung in Kuala Lumpur. Located at the iconic blue traditional mansion belongs to Mahaguru Gayung Abdul Rais Abdul Rahman.

Rubinga Equestarian Park

Rubinga Equestarian Park at Kampung Changkat is known for horseriding and archery.

== Place of worship ==
Madrasah Jumaeah

Madrasah Jumaeah was located at the north of Padang Balang near the former paddy field, now Taman Pelangi. The traditional building still stands despite multiple renovation and restoration due to ageing and termites.

Masjid Jame' Padang Balang

Masjid Jame' Padang Balang is the first and oldest mosque in Padang Balang built in the 1880s. The construction of the mosque is proposed to cater the booming population of Padang Balang reached a number where a new mosque is required for Friday prayer. Before that, peoples of Padang Balang would have to walk to Kuala Lumpur for Friday prayer. The original foundation of the mosque was made of 12 pillars. Nine of the pillars were built by the Batang Kapas peoples while the remaining three were built by Kuantan peoples to mark the unity of the village community.

Madrasah Othmaniyah

Madrasah Othmaniyah is an old madrasah located near Changkat Mulia. It was originally proposed to be the location for Masjid Saidina Ali KW. The location however too near with another mosque in planning by the villagers of Kampung Sungai Mulia, Masjid Batu Lima. Therefore, Padang Balang agreed to change the location of the mosque inward. The madrasah building remained standing and function as a Surau.

Masjid Saidina Ali Karram Allahu Wajhah

Masjid Saidina Ali Karram Allahu Wajhah (KW), was built in 1971 to take over the function of Masjid Jame' Padang Balang that was overcrowded and can no longer cater the number of worshippers in Kampung Padang Balang during Friday prayer. The mosque was built by public donation and opened to the public in 1976. Many Yang di-Pertuan Agong paid visits to this mosque during their reign. Among them are Sultan Yahya Petra of Kelantan, Sultan Ahmad Shah of Pahang, Yamtuan Ja’afar of Negeri Sembilan and Al-Sultan Abdullah Ri’ayatuddin Al-Mustafa Billah Shah of Pahang. The mosque also functions as a cultural and community center to the peoples of Padang Balang. During the resistance against Kuala Lumpur Plan 2020, the mosque played a great role in uniting the villagers and working as a medium between the peoples and the local leaders. The most is one of the official mosque in Federal Territories under the Administration of Islamic Law (Federal Territories) Act 1993

Surau Rabi'ul Awwal

Surau Rabi'ul Awwal is located at Lembah Melewar.

Surau At-Tarbiyyah Al-Islamiyyah

Surau At-Tarbiyyah Al-Islamiyyah is located at Taman Melewar.

Masjid Bilal bin Rabah

Masjid Bilal bin Rabah is located at Taman Koperasi Polis.

== Educational institutions ==
=== Serambi Makkah of Kuala Lumpur ===
Padang Balang is known as the center for Islamic studies, as many religious schools and institutions were built within its territories. The village also served as headquarter of several Islamic movements, for example Markaz Darul Tarbiyah. Many conservative religious political leaders from Malaysian Islamic Party (PAS) and National Trust Party (AMANAH) also regularly meet at Padang Balang. Among them are the late senior journalist Haji Subky Abdul Latif, former Minister of Federal Territories, Khalid Abdul Samad and former Deputy Minister of Law, Mohamed Hanipa Maidin Therefore, the village is dubbed as Serambi Makkah (The verandah of Makkah) of Kuala Lumpur.

=== Tertiary education ===
Kolej Universiti Islam Zulkifli Muhammad

Kolej Universiti Islam Zulkifli Muhammad (KUIZM) is located at former PAS headquarter or Markaaz at Taman Melewar.

=== Secondary and elementary education ===
Maahad Tahfiz Darul Furqan

Maahad Tahfiz Darul Furqan (Darul Furqan) is a private religious school for Quranic studies founded on 15 November 1992 by Al-Fadhil Ustaz Salleh Sani Hj. Harun Al-Hafiz. The school is located near Gombak River. The students come from Malaysia and other parts of ASEAN like Singapore, Brunei, Indonesia, Thailand, Philippines, and Cambodia. Students with good result have the opportunity to continue their studies at Al-Azhar University Egypt in Qiraat, Usuluddin, and Sharia.

Maahad Tahfiz Darul Furqan lil Banat

Maahad Tahfiz Darul Furqan lil Banat is a sister school of Tahfiz Darul Furqan for female students. The school is located near the Gombak River next to Darul Furqan for boys.

Maahad Tahfiz Darul Maarif Al-Islamiah

Maahad Tahfiz Darul Maarif Al-Islamiah is located near Masjid Jame' Kampung Padang Balang.

Maahad Tahfiz Integrasi Madinatul Huffaz

Maahad Tahfiz Integrasi Madinatul Huffaz is located at Taman Melewar.

SRA Saidina Ali Karram Allahu Wajhah

SRA Saidina Ali Karram Allahu Wajhah was an elementary Islamic school run by Federal Territories Islamic Religious Council (Malay: Majlis Agama Islam Wilayah Persekutuan)(MAIWP). The school was founded in 2001 by the committee of Masjid Saidina Ali KAW to teach elementary Islamic education to students in Kampung Padang Balang. The school was originally opened inside the mosque precinct before moved to a new building on Federal Territories Department of Religious Affair land near Kampung Padang Balang Hilir (Taman Pelangi).

SRA Darul Tarbiyyah al-Islamiyyah

SRA Darul Tarbiyyah al-Islamiyyah formerly share location with Surau Darul Tarbiah Taman Melewar, before it was expanded into a fully completed school. This school was founded by the family of Senator Ustaz Hassan Shukri from Malaysian Islamic Party. His wife was the principal of the school.

== Notable people ==
- Datu' Ampat Balang Batang Kapas - the founder of Padang Balang and pioneer of Gombak
- Siti Zainon Ismail - Novelist from Bandar Dalam

== Issues ==
=== Abolishment of Headman Office ===
Previously, Padang Balang practiced Adat Papatih, a Minangkabau traditional system similar to the system in West Sumatra and Negeri Sembilan. The village was governed by Ampat Basa, consisted of elders and religious leader, selected from among the villagers. Ampat Basa was led by headman, known as Datuk Ampat, and assisted by the other elders of Ampat Basa. However, when Kuala Lumpur was sold to the federal government to be made the capital city, the Kuala Lumpur City Hall abolished the headman office, to erase the traditional system completely. Abdul Manaf bin Binok, the grandson of Datuk Balang who holds the office of Datuk Ampat the time, thus become the last headman of Padang Balang. Abdul Manaf still hold the office until his demise in 2000, making him also the last headman in Kuala Lumpur. The void in leadership brought Padang Balang into period of disunity. Some part of Padang Balang seceded to form new villages like the case of Kampung Lembah Melewar and Kampung Bandar Dalam tambahan. Disparation was made worse by political rivalry between UMNO and PAS. The Pakatan Harapan government who won the election in 2018, reintroduced the Headman office, but the appointment was based on political appointment, and not democratically selected among the Waris as per Adat Pepatih. Padang Balang again, went into interregnum when the Pakatan harapan government was toppled in 2020.

=== Kuala Lumpur Plan 2020 & 2040 ===
In 2010, the peoples of Padang Balang, Bandar Dalam and its alliances formed Malay Traditional Villages Community Action Front (Malay: Barisan Bertindak Penduduk Perkampungan Tradisi Melayu) to resist the unpopular publication of Kuala Lumpur 2020 draft by the Kuala Lumpur City Hall. The resistance coalition was led by the then Chairman of Masjid Saidina Ali K.A.W Hj. Zainal Abidin b. Hj. Ma’as and the self-appointed Headman of Kampung Bandar Dalam, Hj. Ishak b. Surin. They were joined by the community of its former alliances inside Kuala Lumpur from Kampung Sungai Merali, Kampung Chubadak, Kampung Sungai Mulia.

The City Hall Mayor at that time was Tan Sri Ahmad Fuad Ismail from Kedah, while the Minister of Federal Territories was Senator Raja Nong Chick from Perak, both are from outside Kuala Lumpur or Selangor. The fight continues and succeeded in influencing political leaders from all sides. This move however only delayed the finalization of Kuala Lumpur Plan 2020 draft to 2012. Despite this, he Barisan Nasional government who ruled that time refuse to publish the final plan out of fear of losing their political support. Less than two years from its expiry date, in November 2018, the newly appointed Minister of Federal Territories, Khalid Abdul Samad from Pakatan Harapan government officially published the Kuala Lumpur Plan 2020. This motive, however, is not for implementation but to give way to the preparation for the new draft for Kuala Lumpur Plan 2040.

In Kuala Lumpur Structural Plan 2040 (PSKL2040), Padang Balang is recognized as one of the nine traditional village in Kuala Lumpur. The other villages also recognized in this plan is Kampung Sungai Mulia, Kampung Sungai Merali, Kampung Banda Dalam, Kampung Chubadak Hulu, Kampung Puah, Kampung Pandan Melayu, Kampung Pandan India and Kampung Pasir Baru.
