= Royal Malaysian Police Museum =

Coordinates: 3°08′27.8″N 101°41′19.1″E

- Muzium Polis Diraja Malaysia
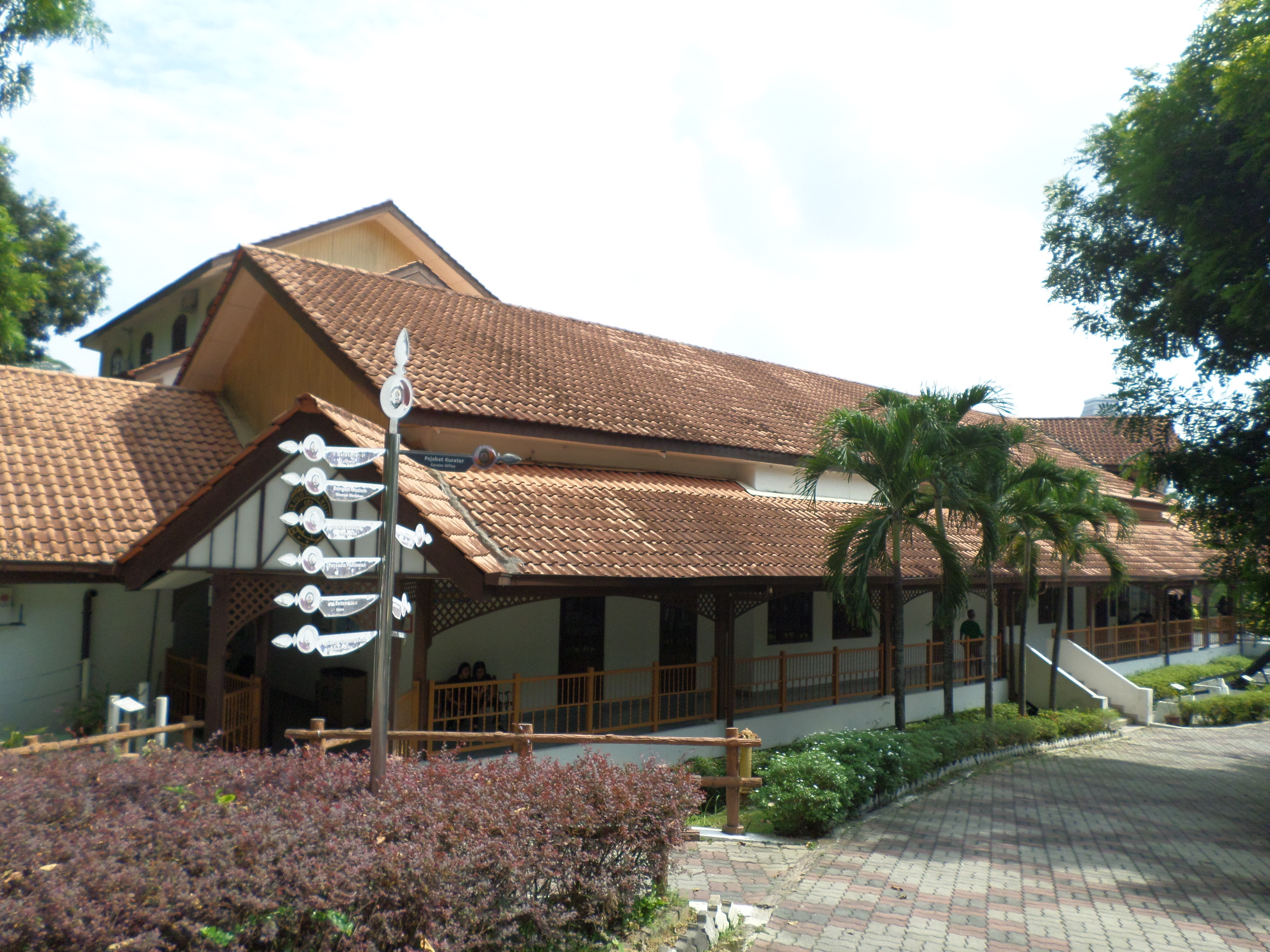
- Established: 1958 (original building); July 1998 (current building)
- Location: Kuala Lumpur, Malaysia
- Type: Museum

The Royal Malaysia Police Museum (Malay: Muzium Polis Diraja Malaysia) is a museum that showcases the history of the Royal Malaysia Police, located in Kuala Lumpur, Malaysia. The museum includes exhibits from the history of the Royal Malaysia Police since its origins under British colonial rule until the 1970s. It is open daily, except Monday, from 1000 to 1800 hours, and admission is free.

== Construction history ==
The original wooden Royal Malaysian Police Museum was built in 1958 under the supervision of Police Training Centre (PULAPOL) Superintendent P.B. Gerry Waller. Its early collections exhibited the instructional materials from the Police Training Centre. The Royal Malaysian Police Museum was later inaugurated on 9 January 1961 by His Majesty the 3rd Yang di-Pertuan Agong Tuanku Syed Putra.

To accommodate the growing number of artifacts, Inspector-General of Police Tan Sri Mohammed Hanif Omar first proposed moving the museum to a new location in Kuala Lumpur on 16 October 1983. Construction on the site began on 18 February 1993 and was finished after four years, at a cost of 4.9 million ringgit for construction and 2.9 million ringgit for interior design. Deputy Prime Minister at that time Dato' Seri Abdullah Ahmad Badawi unveiled the grand opening of the new museum site in July 1998.

== Exhibits ==
The Royal Malaysia Police Museum is divided into three lettered galleries.

=== Gallery A ===
The gallery explains how policing used to be carried out during the days of the early Malays Sultanate, for example where Temenggung performed the role of police chief and prison superintendent among his many others responsibilities.

Walking through replicas of old Malacca streets you learned about policing during the Portuguese and Dutch colonial eras before arriving at the British era where today's RMP has its origin.

=== Gallery B ===
This gallery provides details on how the police during Malaya's and the Straits Settlement (Penang, Malacca, Singapore), Federated Malay States (Selangor, Perak, Pahang, Negeri Sembilan), Unfederated Malay States (Kedah, Perlis, Kelantan, Terengganu) Sabah and Sarawak.

=== Gallery C ===
This gallery covers the Malayan emergency and describes the sacrifices and the struggle against the CT's and the success of the police's Special branch in particular in helping to defeat that determined enemy.

== Transportation ==
The museum is accessible within walking distance west of Kuala Lumpur railway station.

== See also ==
- List of museums in Malaysia

== Literature ==
- Lenzi, Iola (2004). Museums of Southeast Asia. Singapore: Archipelago Press. pp. 200 pages. ISBN 981-4068-96-9.

== Location ==
Royal Malaysian Police Museum,5 Jalan Perdana, 50480 Kuala Lumpur
