= Kuala Lumpur =

Capital and largest city of Malaysia

- Federal capital city
- Federal Territory of Kuala Lumpur; Wilayah Persekutuan Kuala Lumpur (Malay)
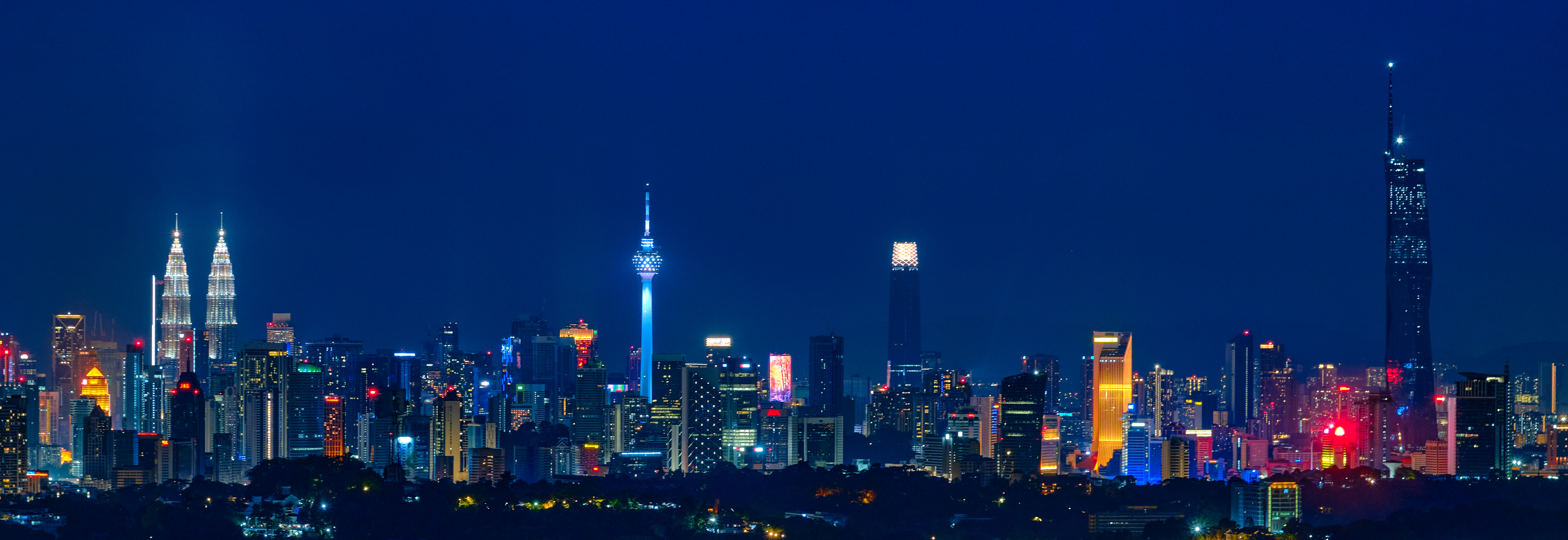
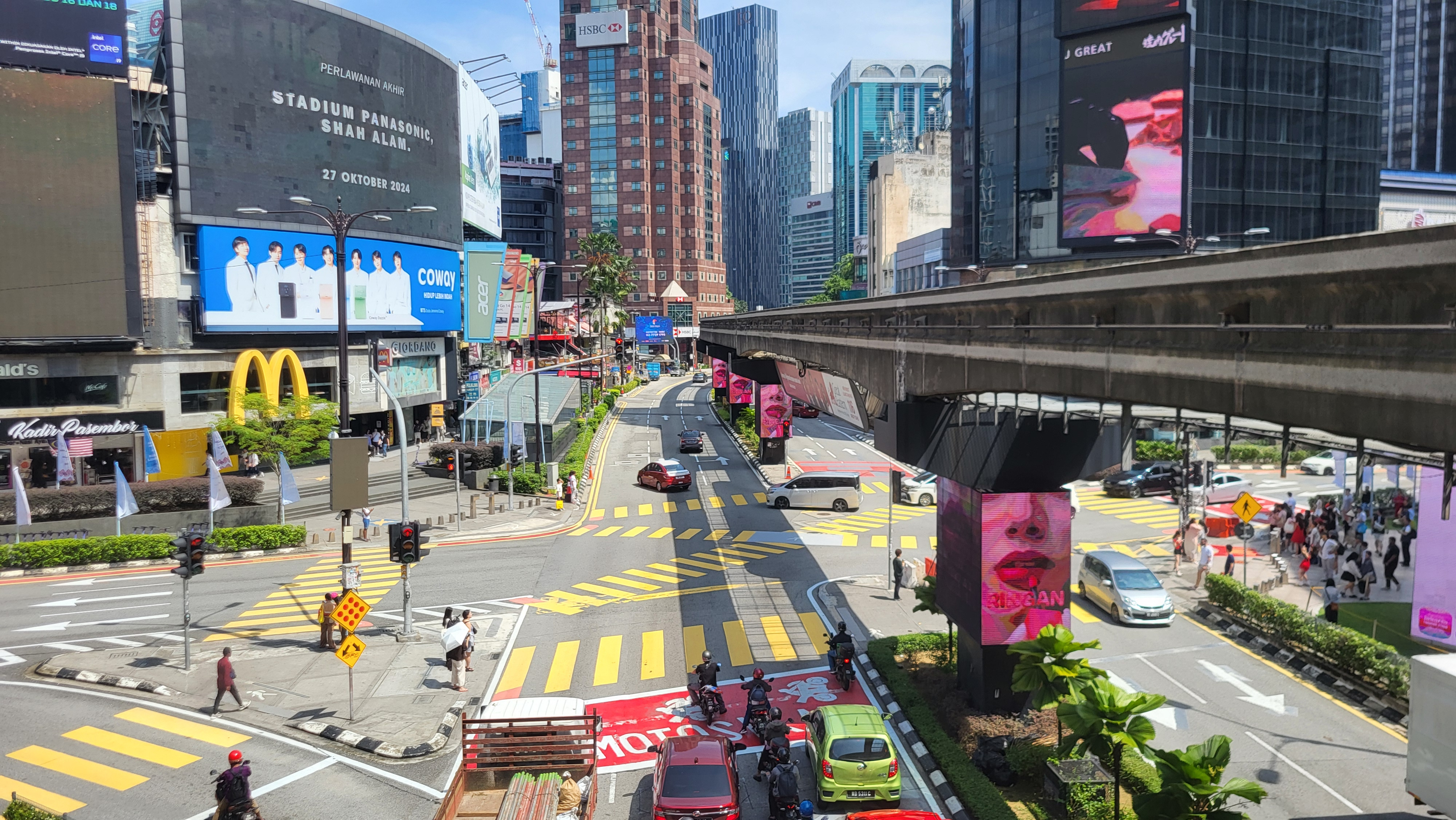
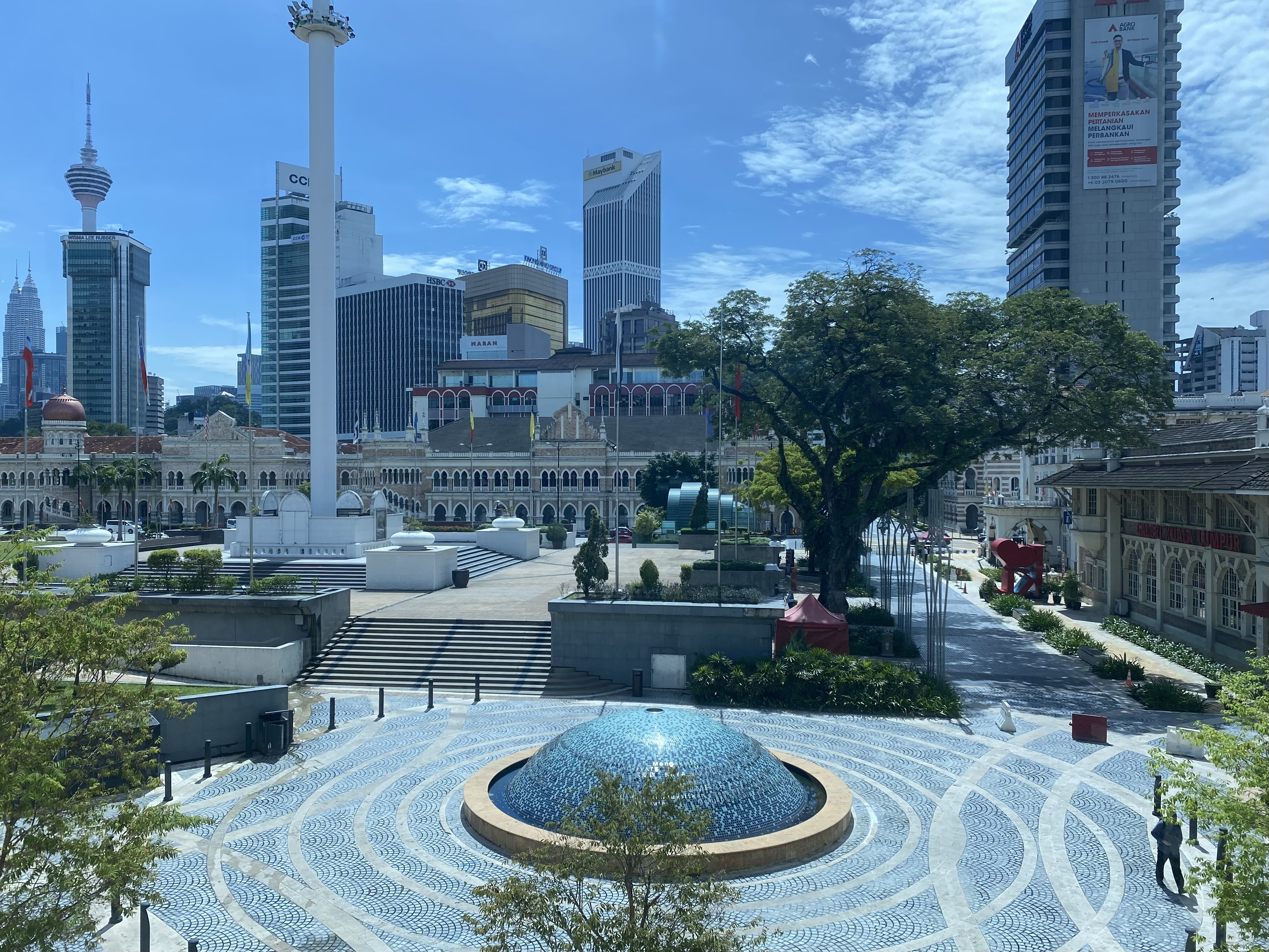
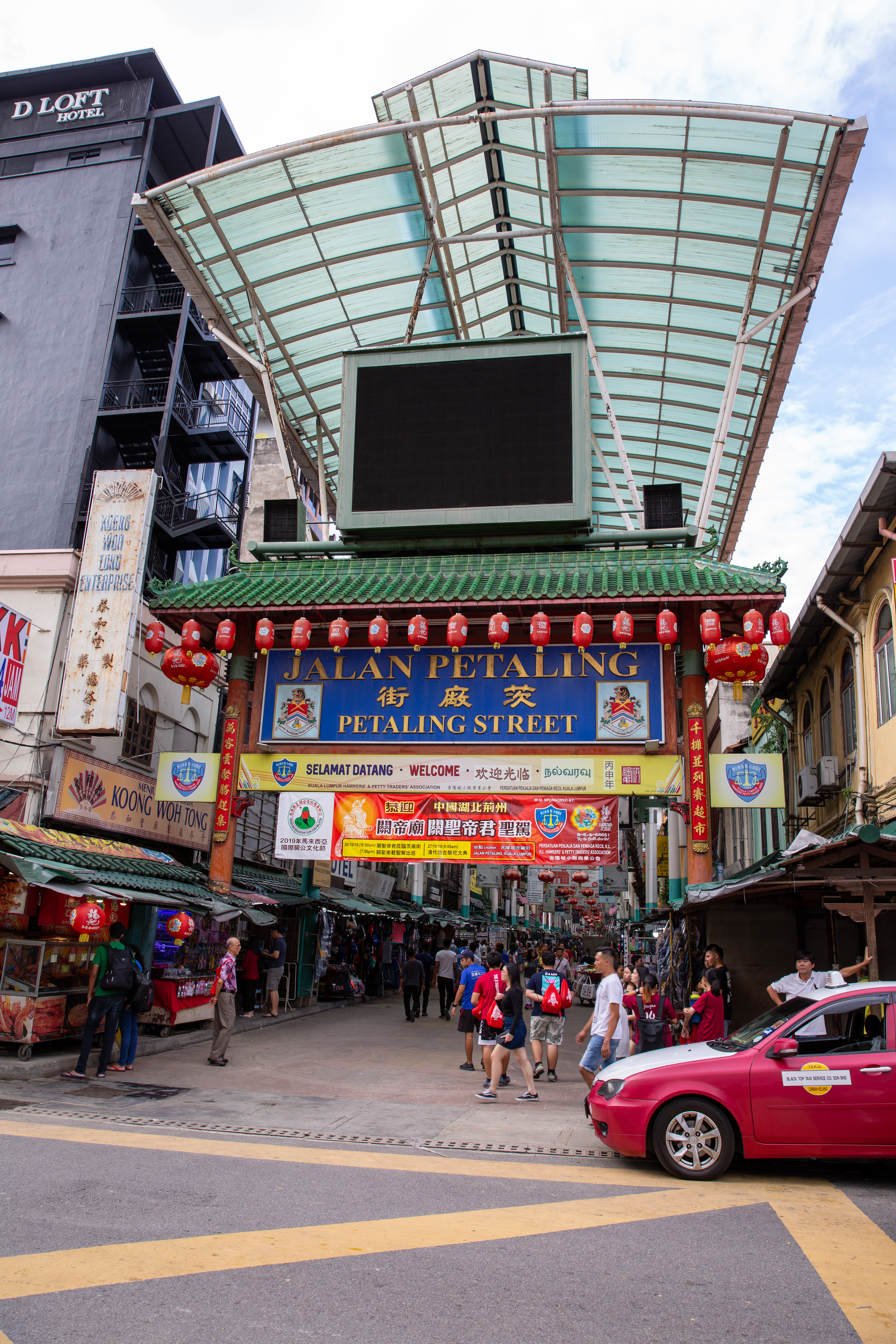
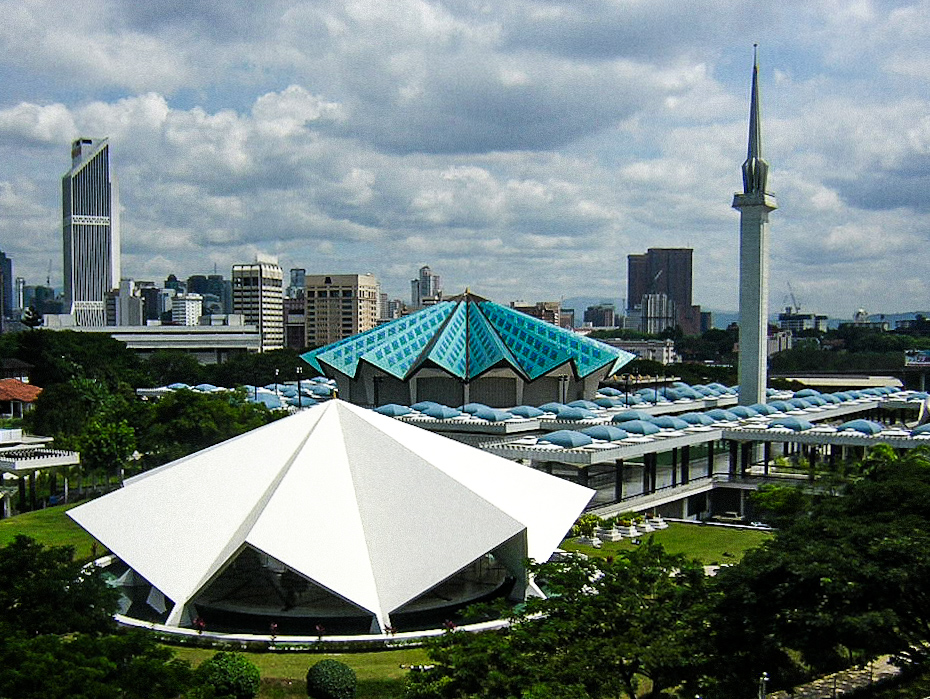
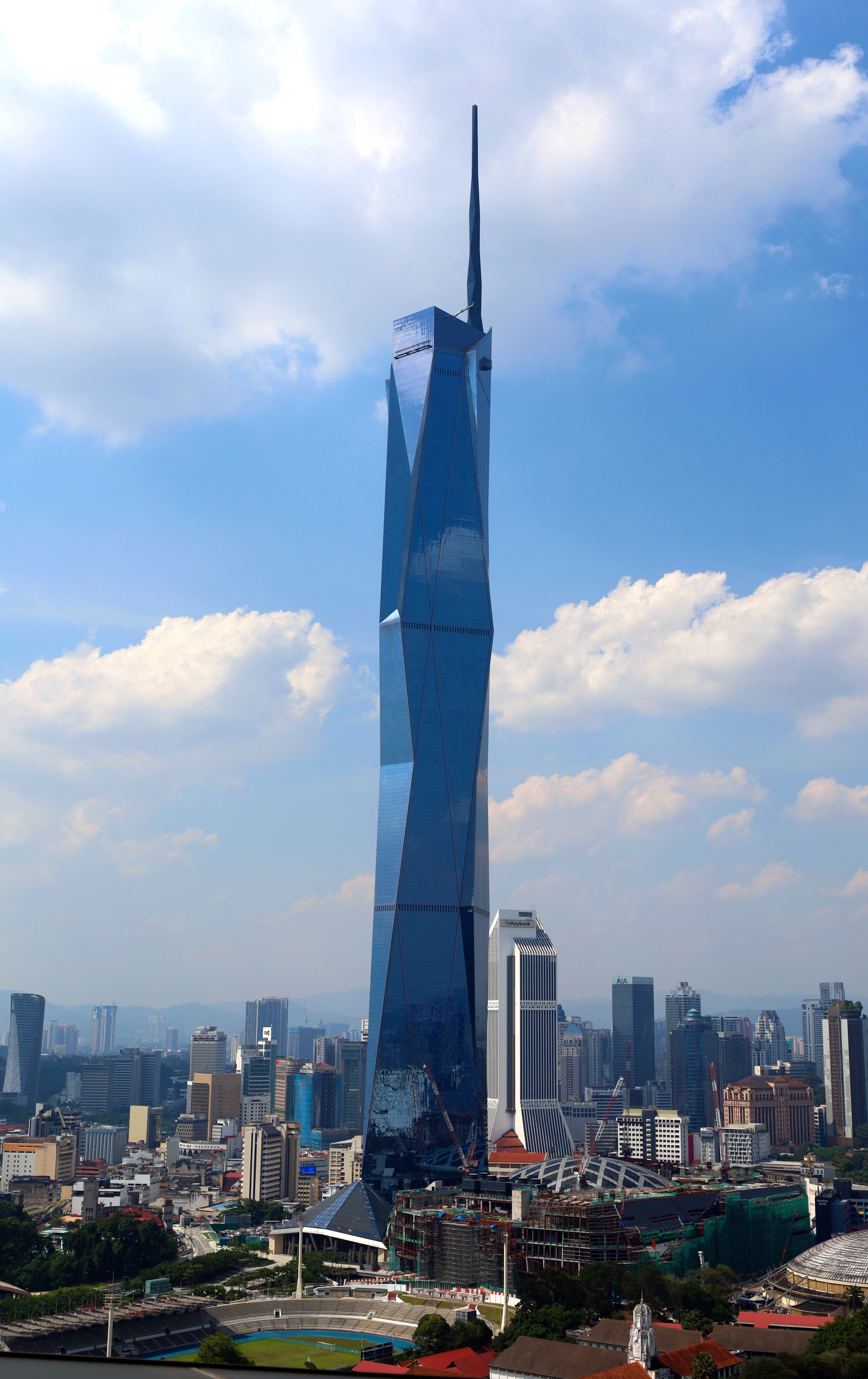
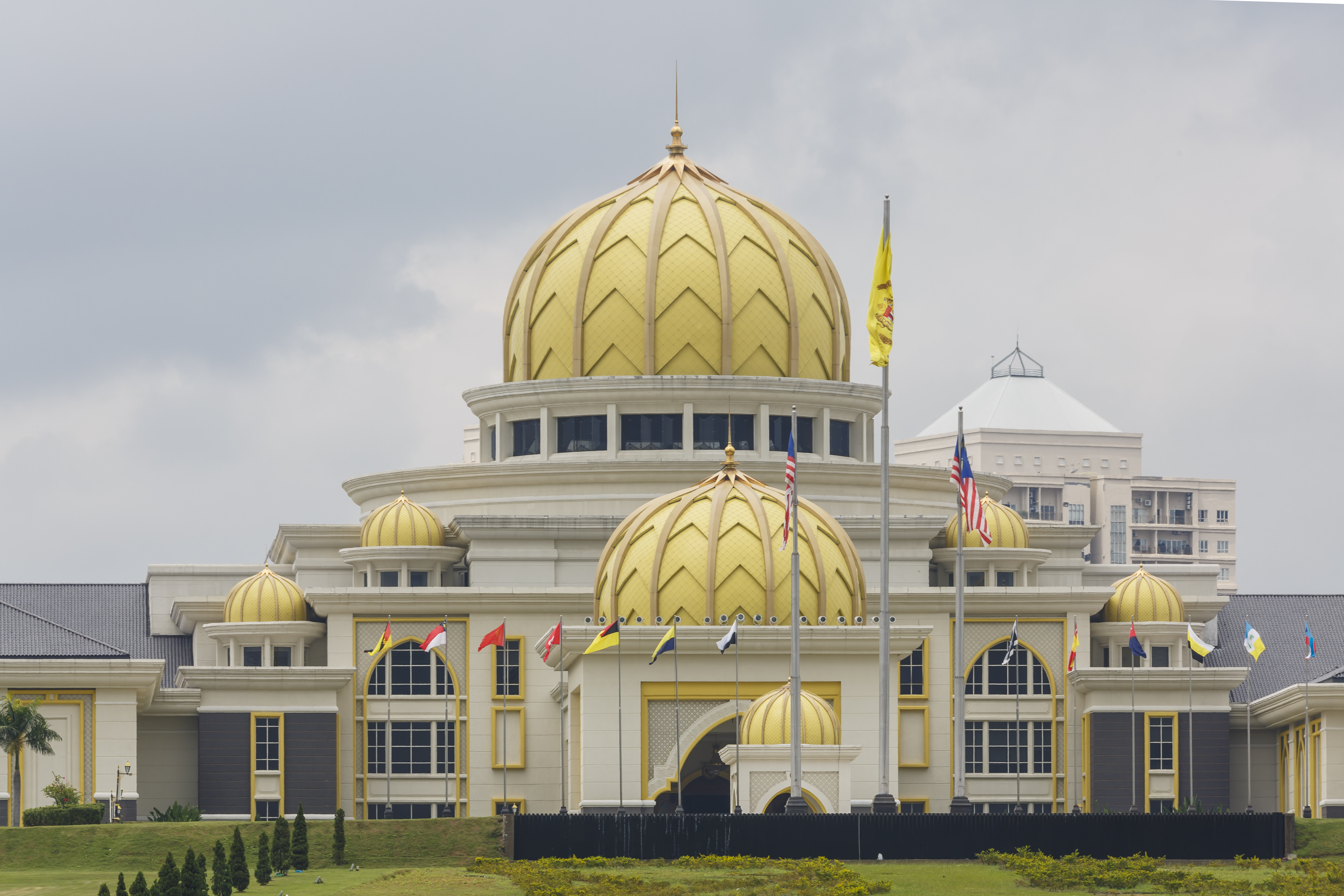
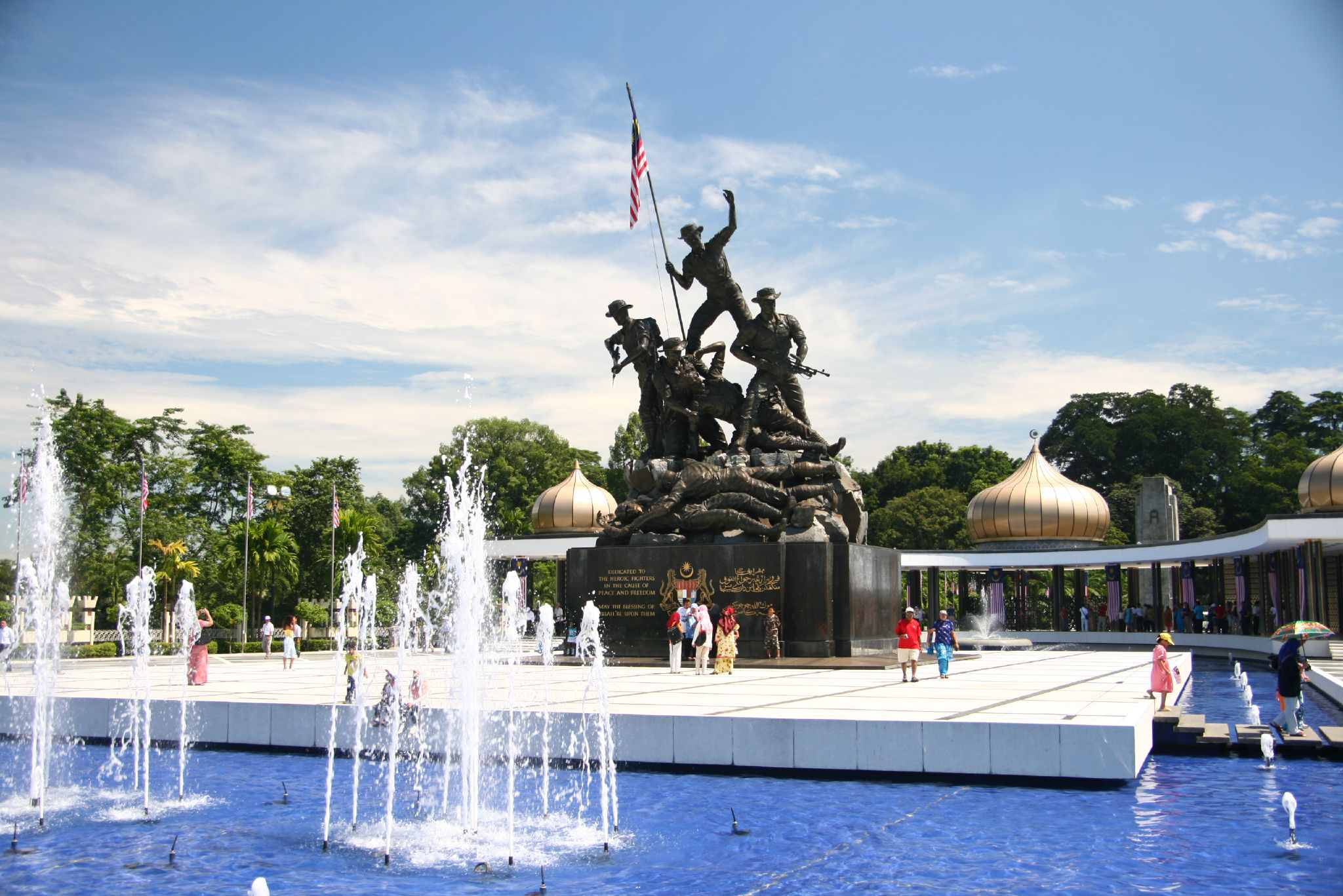
- Skyline of KLCC at night Bukit Bintang Merdeka Square Petaling Street National Mosque Merdeka 118 National Palace National Monument

- Flag Seal Coat of arms
- Motto(s): Dewan Bandaraya Kuala Lumpur (English: "Kuala Lumpur City Hall")
- Anthem: Maju dan Sejahtera "Progress and Prosper"
- Interactive map of Kuala Lumpur
- Location within Malaysia Location within Asia
- Coordinates: 03°08′52″N 101°41′43″E
- Country: Malaysia
- Administrative areas: Show areas: Bukit Bintang; Seputeh; Segambut; Kepong; Titiwangsa; Setiawangsa; Bandar Tun Razak; Cheras; Wangsa Maju; Batu; Lembah Pantai
- Establishment: 1857
- City status: 1 February 1972
- Transferred to federal jurisdiction: 1 February 1974

Government
  - Type: Federal administration with local government
  - Body: Kuala Lumpur City Hall
  - Mayor: Fadlun Mak Ujud
- Federal representation: Parliament of Malaysia
  - Dewan Rakyat seats: 11 of 222 (5.0%)
  - Dewan Negara seats: 2 of 70 (2.9%)

Area
  - Federal capital city: 243 km^{2} (94 sq mi)
  - Urban: 1,940 km^{2} (750 sq mi)
  - Metro: 2,243.27 km^{2} (866.13 sq mi)
- Elevation: 63 m (207 ft)
- Highest elevation (Bukit Dinding): 302 m (991 ft)

Population (Q1 2024)
  - Federal capital city: 2,075,600
  - Rank: 1st
  - Density: 8,540/km^{2} (22,100/sq mi)
  - Urban: 8,430,775
  - Metro: 8,815,630
  - Metro density: 2,708/km^{2} (7,010/sq mi)
  - Demonym: KLite / Orang KL (Literal means 'KL People') / Kuala Lumpurian

GDP (nominal, 2024)
  - Metro: RM697 billion (US$152.643 billion)
  - Per capita: US$16,800

City Index
  - HDI (2024): 0.899 (very high) (1st)
- Time zone: UTC+8 (MST)
- Postal code: 50000 to 60000
- Mean solar time: UTC+06:46:46
- Area code(s): 03
- Vehicle registration: V and W (except taxis); HW (for taxis only)
- ISO 3166-2: MY-14
- Official language(s): Malay; English; (de facto)
- Climate: Tropical rainforest climate (Af)
- Website: dbkl.gov.my

Kuala Lumpur (KL), (Note: UK: /ˌkwɑːlə ˈlʊmpʊər, -pər/ KWAH-lə LUUM-poor, -pər, also US: /- lʊmˈpʊər/ - luum-POOR; Malaysian: [ˈkualə, ˈkwa-, ˈlumpo(r), -la -, -pʊ(r),-puɾ,-poɾ]) officially the Federal Territory of Kuala Lumpur, (Note: Malay: Wilayah Persekutuan Kuala Lumpur) is the capital city and a federal territory of Malaysia. It is the most populous city in the country, covering an area of 243 km^{2} (94 sq mi) with a population of 2,111,536 as of 2026. Greater Kuala Lumpur, which itself includes the Klang Valley, is an urban agglomeration of 8.81 million people as of 2024. It is among the fastest growing metropolitan regions in Southeast Asia, in terms of both population and economic development.

The city serves as the cultural, financial, tourism, political and economic centre of Malaysia. It is also home to the Malaysian parliament (consisting of the Dewan Rakyat and the Dewan Negara) and the Istana Negara, the official residence of the monarch (Yang di-Pertuan Agong). Kuala Lumpur was first developed around 1857 as a town serving the tin mines of the region by Raja Abdullah , and important figures such as Yap Ah Loy and Frank Swettenham were instrumental in the early development of the city during the late 19th century. It served as the capital of Selangor from 1880 until 1978. Kuala Lumpur was the founding capital of the Federation of Malaya and its successor, Malaysia. The city remained the seat of the executive and judicial branches of the Malaysian federal government until these were relocated to Putrajaya in early 1999. However, some sections of the political bodies still remain in Kuala Lumpur. The city is one of the three Federal Territories of Malaysia, enclaved within the state of Selangor, on the central west coast of Peninsular Malaysia.

Since the 1990s, the city has played host to many international sporting, political and cultural events, including the 1998 Commonwealth Games, 2001 Southeast Asian Games, 2017 Southeast Asian Games, Formula One, Moto GP and 1997 FIFA World Youth Championships. Kuala Lumpur has undergone rapid development in recent decades and is home to the tallest twin buildings in the world, the Petronas Towers, which have since become an iconic symbol of Malaysian development. Kuala Lumpur is well connected with neighbouring urban metro regions such as Petaling Jaya via the rapidly expanding Klang Valley Integrated Transit System. Residents of the city can also travel to other parts of Peninsular Malaysia as well as to Kuala Lumpur International Airport (KLIA) via rail through Kuala Lumpur Sentral station.

Kuala Lumpur was ranked the 6th most-visited city in the world on the Mastercard Destination Cities Index in 2019. The city houses three of the world's ten largest shopping malls. Kuala Lumpur ranks 70th in the world and second in Southeast Asia after Singapore in the Economist Intelligence Unit's Global Liveability Ranking and ninth in Asia-Pacific and second in Southeast Asia after Singapore in KPMG's Leading Technology Innovation Hub 2021. Kuala Lumpur was named World Book Capital 2020 by UNESCO. In 2025, Kuala Lumpur was ranked second for the best outstanding city in Southeast Asia, after Singapore, and 79th in the world by the Oxford Economic Papers' Global Cities Index.

== Etymology ==
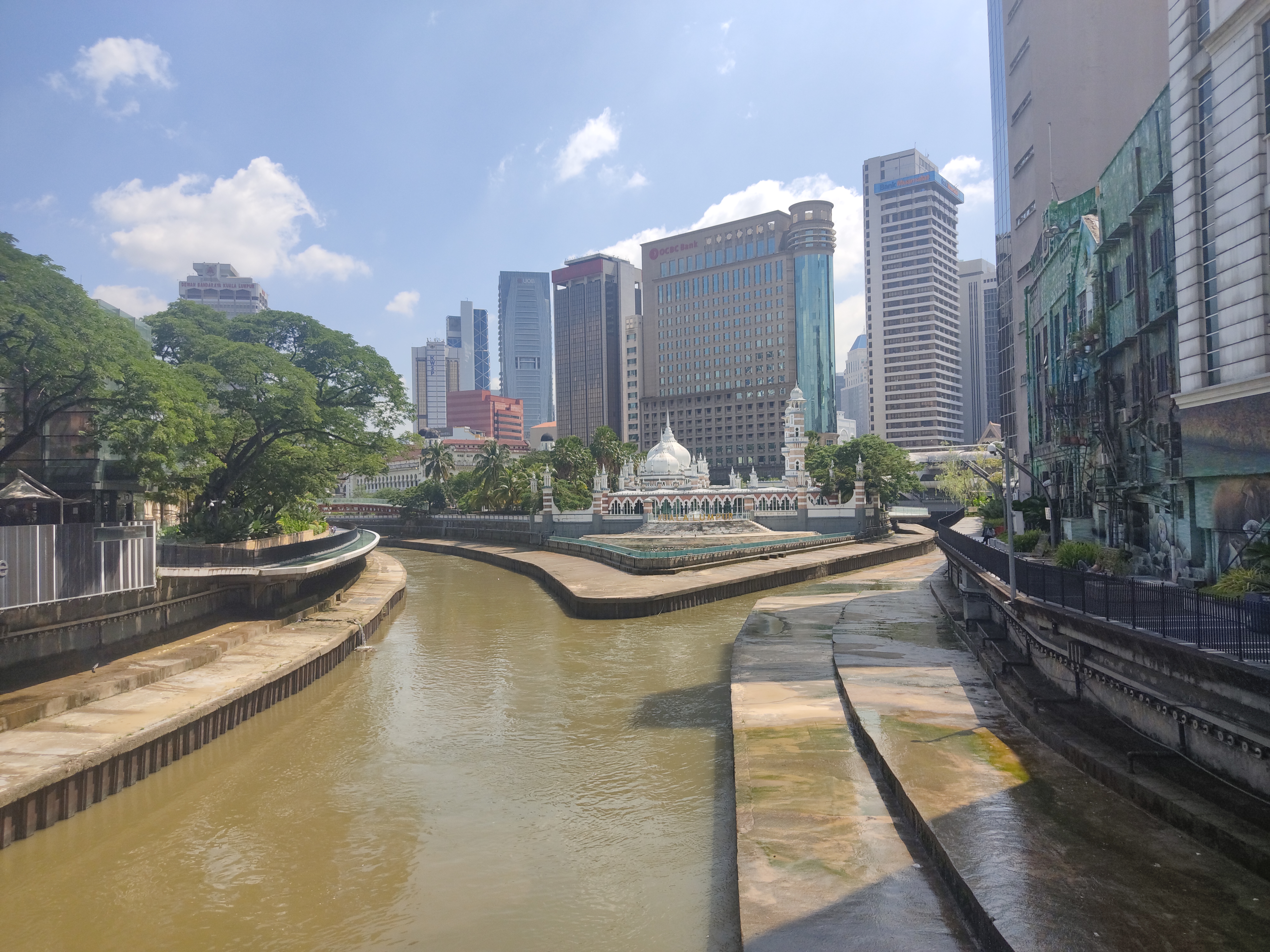
Jamek Mosque at the confluence of the Gombak (left) and Klang rivers. The earliest settlement of Kuala Lumpur developed on the eastern side of the river bank (to the right in this picture).

Kuala Lumpur means "muddy confluence" in Malay: kuala is the point where two rivers join, or an estuary, and lumpur means "mud". One suggestion is that it was named after Sungai Lumpur ("muddy river"); in the 1820s, a place named Sungei Lumpoor was said to be the most important tin-producing settlement on the Klang River. However, Kuala Lumpur lies at the confluence of the Gombak and Klang rivers and therefore should be called Kuala Gombak, since the kuala is typically named after the river that joins a larger river or the sea. Some have argued that Sungai Lumpur extended to the confluence, therefore, the point where it joined the Klang River would be Kuala Lumpur. This Sungai Lumpur is speculated to be Treacher Valley Stream that joined the Klang River 1.5 kilometres (1 mile) upstream from the Gombak confluence near Bukit Nanas, or perhaps a river located to the north of the Batu Caves area.

It has also been proposed that Kuala Lumpur was originally named Pengkalan Lumpur ("muddy landing place"), but became corrupted into Kuala Lumpur. Another theory says that it was initially a Cantonese word, lam-pa, meaning "flooded jungle" or "decayed jungle". There is no firm contemporary evidence for these suggestions other than anecdotes, however. The name may also be a corrupted form of an earlier forgotten name.

== History ==
=== Early years ===
Historical affiliations

Sultanate of Selangor 1857–1974
Federated Malay States 1895–1942; 1945–1946
Empire of Japan 1942–1945
Malayan Union 1946–1948
Federation of Malaya 1948–1963
Malaysia 1963–present

The official account considers Kuala Lumpur to have been founded by the Malay Chief of Klang, Raja Abdullah, who sent Chinese miners into the region to open tin mines in 1857, although it is unclear who the first settlers were since there were likely settlements at the Gombak-Klang river confluence before that in the 1820s. The indigenous Temuan people may have inhabited the area for some time, Chinese miners were known to be involved in tin mining up the Selangor River in the 1840s about 16 kilometres (10 miles) north of present-day Kuala Lumpur, and Mandailing Sumatrans led by Raja Asal and Sutan Puasa were also involved in tin mining and trade in the Ulu Klang region before 1860, and Sumatrans may have settled in the upper reaches of Klang River in the first quarter of the 19th century, or possibly earlier. Kuala Lumpur was originally a small hamlet of just a few houses and shops at the confluence of the Sungai Gombak and Sungai Klang (Klang River). Kuala Lumpur became established as a town c. 1857, when Raja Abdullah bin Raja Jaafar, aided by his brother Raja Juma'at of Lukut, raised funds from Malaccan Chinese businessmen to hire Chinese miners from Lukut to open new tin mines there. The miners landed at Kuala Lumpur and continued on foot to Ampang, where they opened the first mine. Kuala Lumpur was the furthest point up the Klang River to which supplies could conveniently be brought by boat and therefore became a collection and dispersal point serving the tin mines.

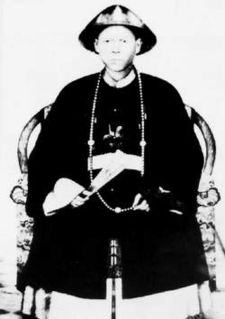
Kapitan Yap Ah Loy, the third Chinese Kapitan of Kuala Lumpur

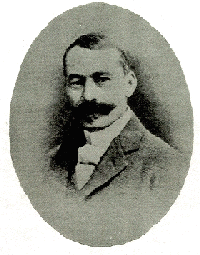
Frank Swettenham,
credited with Kuala Lumpur's rapid growth and development

Despite a high death toll from the malarial conditions of the jungle, the Ampang mines succeeded and exported the first tin in 1859. At that time, Sutan Puasa was already trading near Ampang. Two traders from Lukut, Hiu Siew and Yap Ah Sze, arrived in Kuala Lumpur and set up shops to sell provisions to miners in exchange for tin. The town, spurred on by tin-mining, started to develop around Old Market Square (Medan Pasar), with roads radiating out towards Ampang as well as Pudu and Batu (the destinations became the names of these roads: Ampang Road, Pudu Road, and Batu Road), where miners had also begun to settle in, and Petaling and Damansara. The miners formed gangs and the gangs frequently fought in this period, particularly factions of Kuala Lumpur and Kanching, mainly over control of the best tin mines. Leaders of the Chinese community were conferred the title of Kapitan Cina (Chinese headman) by the Malay chief, and Hiu Siew, the early Chinese trader, became the first Kapitan of Kuala Lumpur. The third Chinese Kapitan of Kuala Lumpur, Yap Ah Loy, was appointed in 1868.

After the mines were opened, Raja Abdullah then sent a garrison under the command of a Bugis lieutenant to man a stockade built at Bukit Nanas. Important Malay figures of early Kuala Lumpur also included Haji Mohamed Tahir, who became the Dato Dagang ("chief of traders"). The Minangkabaus of Sumatra became another important group who traded and established tobacco plantations in the area. Notable Minangkabaus included their headman, Dato' Sati, Utsman Abdullah, and Haji Mohamed Taib, who was involved in the early development of Kampung Baru. The Minangkabaus were also significant socio-religious figures, for example Utsman bin Abdullah was the first kadi of Kuala Lumpur, as well as Muhammad Nur bin Ismail.

=== Beginning of modern Kuala Lumpur ===
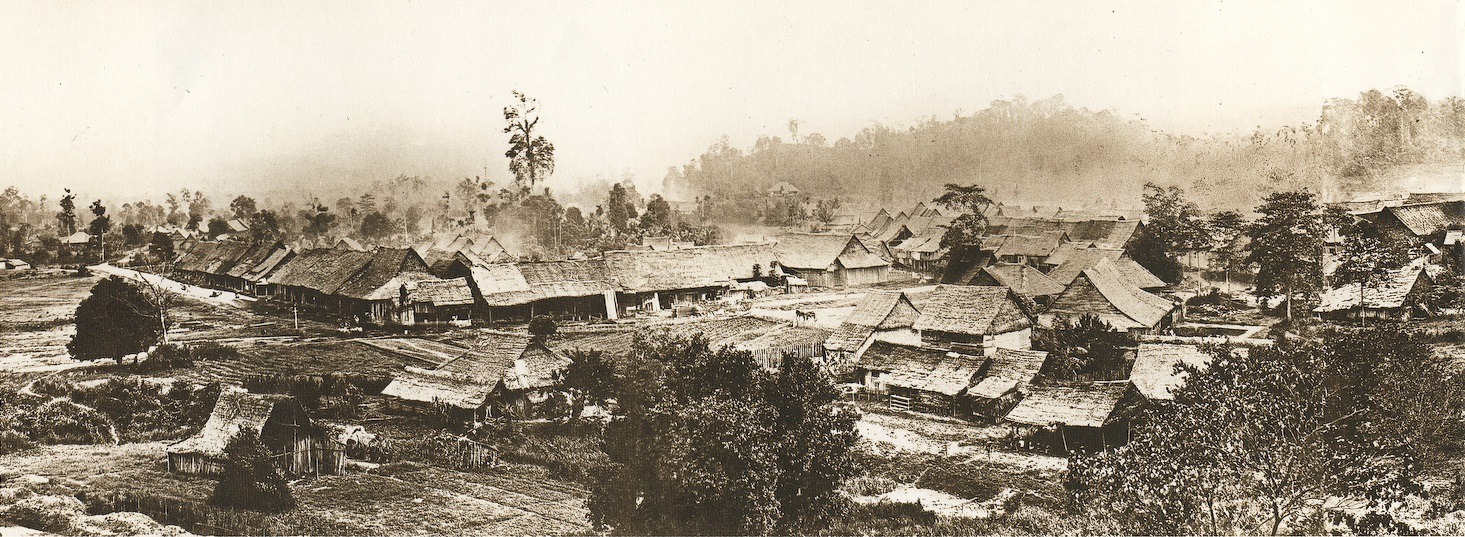
Part of a panoramic view of Kuala Lumpur c. 1884. To the left is the Padang. The buildings were mostly constructed of wood and atap before regulations enacted by Swettenham in 1884 required buildings to use bricks and tiles. The appearance of Kuala Lumpur transformed rapidly in the following years due to the building regulations.

Early Kuala Lumpur was a small town that suffered from many social and political problems – the buildings were mostly made of wood and 'atap' (palm frond thatching). The buildings were prone to catching fire, and due to a lack of proper sanitation, the town was plagued with diseases. It also suffered from a constant threat of flooding due to its location. The town became embroiled in the Selangor Civil War in part over control of revenue from the tin mines. Yap Ah Loy allied himself with Tengku Kudin and the Hai San secret society, they fought against a rival secret society, Ghee Hin, who allied themselves with Raja Mahdi. Raja Asal and Sutan Puasa switched sides to Raja Mahdi, and Kuala Lumpur was captured in 1872 and burnt to the ground. Kudin escaped to Klang where he assembled another fighting force and recaptured Kuala Lumpur in March 1873, defeating Raja Mahdi's forces with the help of Pahang's military under Ahmad Muʽazzam. The war and other setbacks, such as dropping tin prices, led to a slump. A major outbreak of cholera caused many to flee. The slump lasted until late 1879, when rising prices for tin allowed the town to recover. In late 1881, the town was severely flooded, after a fire that had destroyed the entire town in January. With the town being rebuilt a few times and having thrived, this was due in large to Yap Ah Loy. Yap, together with Frank Swettenham who was appointed the Resident in 1882, were the two most important figures of early Kuala Lumpur with Swettenham credited with its rapid growth and development and its transformation into a major urban centre.

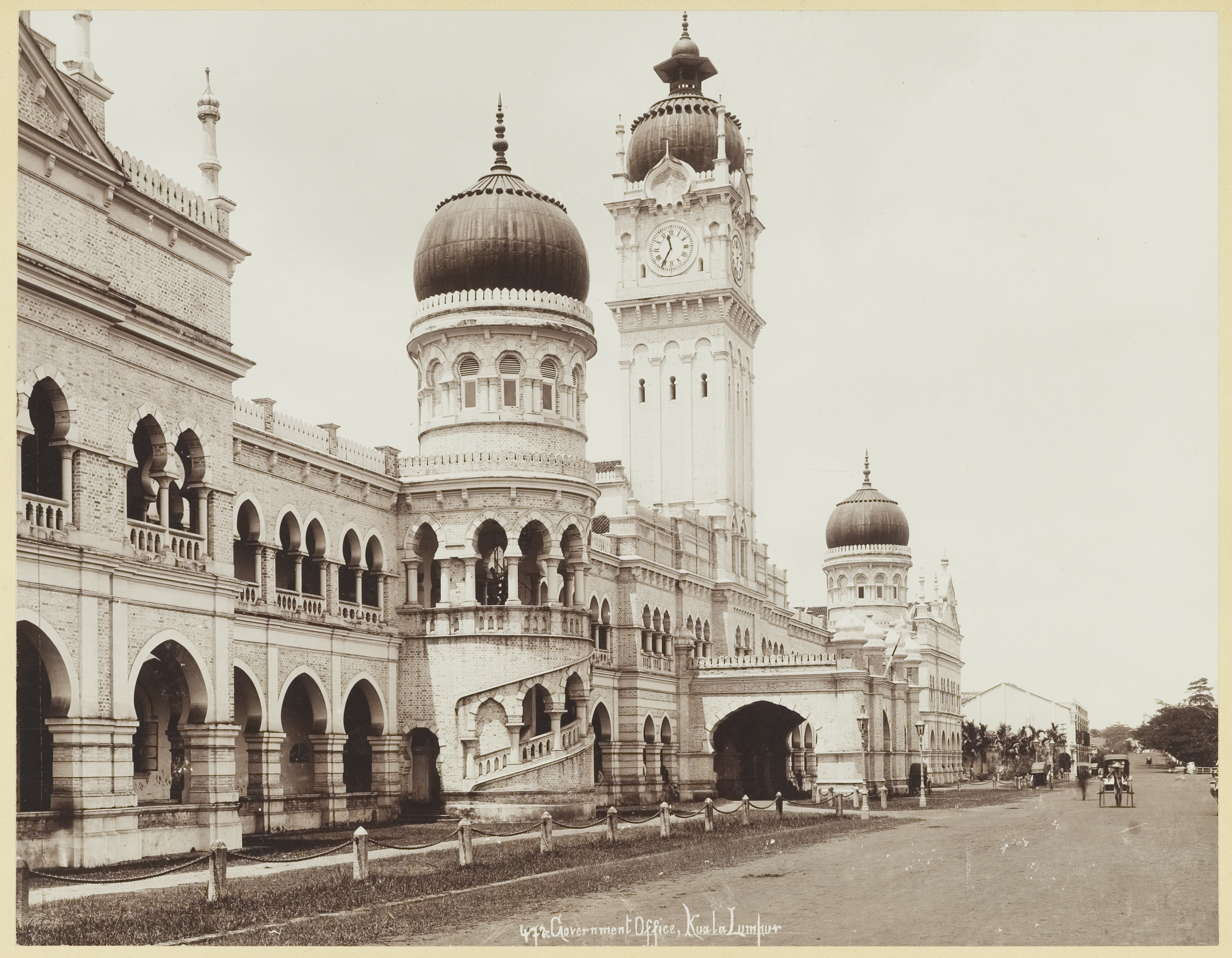
The Government Offices of the Federated Malay States (now the Sultan Abdul Samad Building) facing the Padang, c. 1900

The early Chinese and Malay settled along the east bank of the Klang River. The Chinese mainly settled around the commercial centre of Market Square. The Malays, and later Indian Chettiars and Muslims, resided in the Java Street area, now Jalan Tun Perak. In 1880, the colonial administration moved the state capital of Selangor from Klang to the more strategically advantageous Kuala Lumpur, and British Resident William Bloomfield Douglas decided to locate the government buildings and living quarters to the west of the river. Government offices and a new police headquarters were built on Bukit Aman, and the Padang was initially created for police training. The Padang, now known as Independence Square, would later become the centre of the British administrative offices when the colonial government offices moved to the Sultan Abdul Samad Building in 1897.

Frank Swettenham, on becoming the British Resident, began improving the town by cleaning up the streets. He also stipulated in 1884 that buildings should be constructed of brick and tile so that they would be less flammable, and that the town be rebuilt with wider streets to reduce fire risk. Kapitan Yap Ah Loy bought a sprawling piece of real estate to set up a brick factory for the rebuilding of Kuala Lumpur, the eponymous Brickfields. Demolished atap buildings were replaced with brick and tile buildings, and many of the new brick buildings had "five-foot ways" and Chinese carpentry work. This resulted in a distinct eclectic shop house architecture typical to this region. Kapitan Yap Ah Loy expanded road access, linking tin mines with the city with the main arterial routes of the present Ampang Road, Pudu Road and Petaling Street. As Chinese Kapitan, he held wide powers on a par with Malay community leaders. Law reforms were implemented and new legal measures were introduced to the assembly. Yap also presided over a small claims court. With a police force of six, he was able to uphold the rule of law, constructing a prison that could accommodate sixty prisoners at a time. Yap Ah Loy also built Kuala Lumpur's first school and a major tapioca mill in Petaling Street, in which the Selangor's Sultan Abdul Samad held an interest.

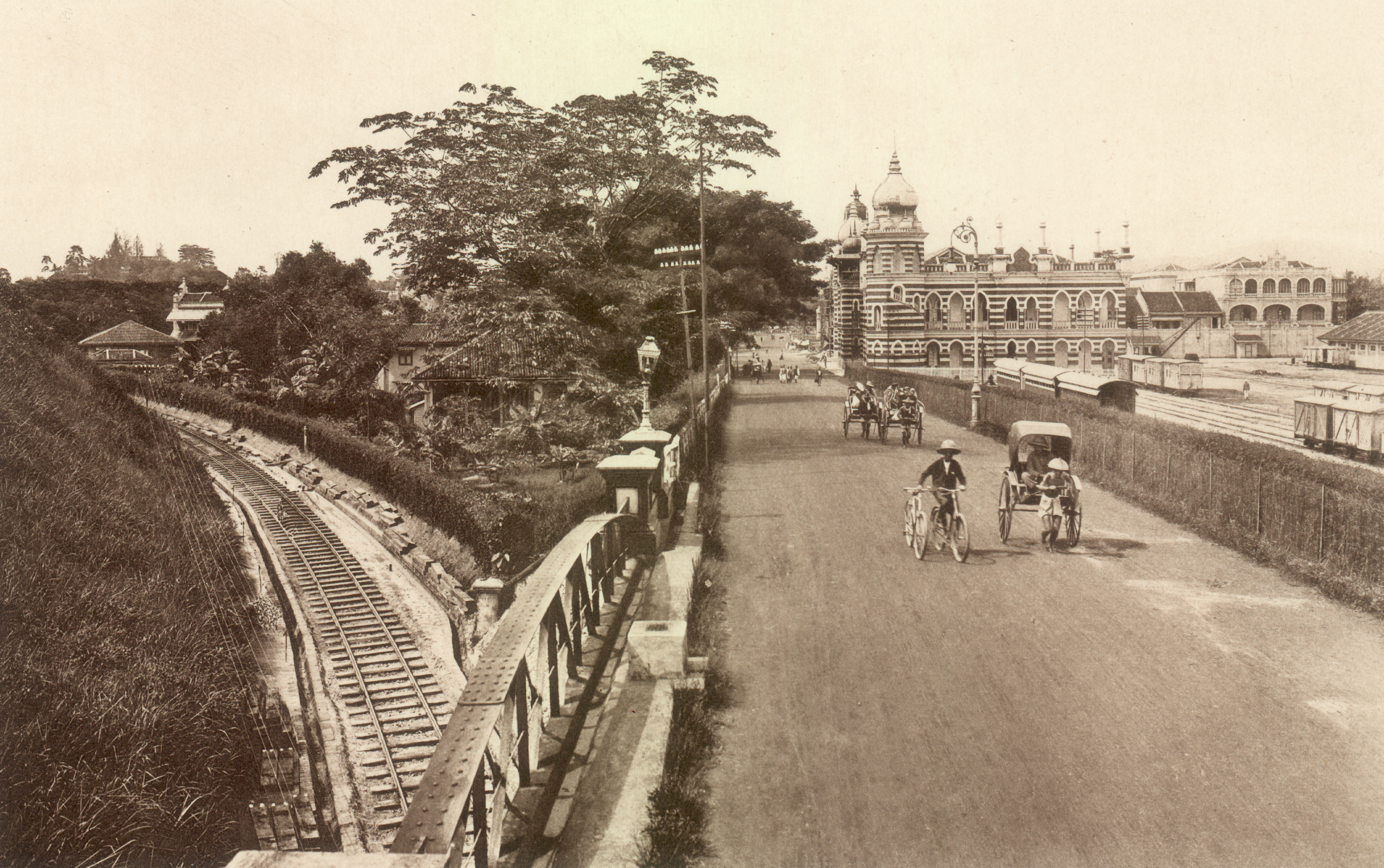
The construction of railway spurred the growth of the city. The first headquarters of the Federated Malay States Railways (now the National Textile Museum) near the F.M.S. Government Offices in the distance, c. 1910.

A railway line between Kuala Lumpur and Klang, initiated by Swettenham and completed in 1886, increased access and resulted in rapid growth. The population grew from 4,500 in 1884 to 20,000 in 1890. As development intensified in the 1880s, putting pressure on sanitation, waste disposal and other health measures. A Sanitary Board created on 14 May 1890 was responsible for sanitation, road upkeep, street lighting, and other functions. This would eventually become the Kuala Lumpur Municipal Council in 1948. In 1896, Kuala Lumpur was chosen as the capital of the newly formed Federated Malay States.

=== 20th century–present ===
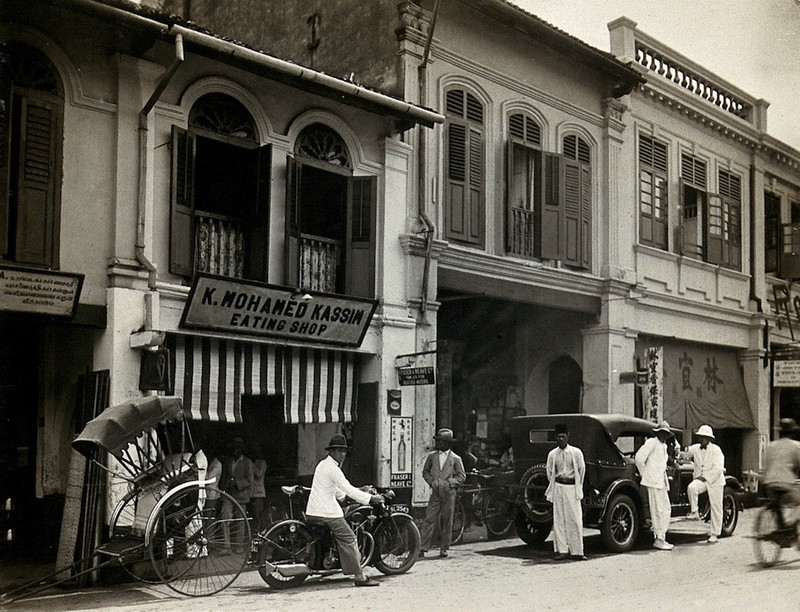
An arcade of shophouses with a road sweeper at work in the street of Kuala Lumpur, c. 1915–1925

Kuala Lumpur expanded considerably in the 20th century. It was 0.65 km^{2} (0.25 sq mi) in 1895, but was extended to encompass 20 km^{2} (7.7 sq mi) in 1903, and to 52 km^{2} (20 sq mi) by 1924. By the time it became a municipality in 1948 it had expanded to 93 km^{2} (36 sq mi), and then to 243 km^{2} (94 sq mi) in 1974 as a Federal Territory.

Until 1974, Kuala Lumpur was one of the seven districts of Selangor (six before 1960). The Kuala Lumpur district comprises eight (later nine) mukims – Sungai Buloh, Batu, Petaling, Ampang, Ulu Klang, Kuala Lumpur (city and suburbs), Setapak and (since 1953) Petaling Jaya.

The development of a rubber industry in Selangor fuelled by the demand for car tyres in the early 20th century led to a boom, and the population of Kuala Lumpur increased from 30,000 in 1900 to 80,000 in 1920. The commercial activities of Kuala Lumpur had been run to a large extent by Chinese businessmen such as Loke Yew, who was then the richest and most influential Chinese in Kuala Lumpur. The growth of the rubber industry led to an influx of foreign capital and planters, with new companies and industries becoming established in Kuala Lumpur, and other companies previously based elsewhere also found a presence here.

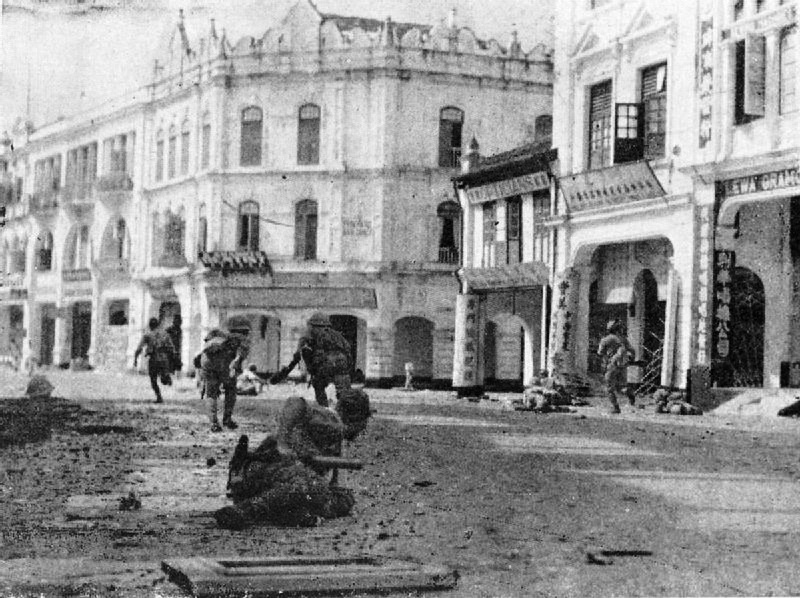
Japanese troops advancing up High Street (now Jalan Tun H S Lee) in Kuala Lumpur in December 1941 during World War II

During World War II, The British army was completely defeated by the Japanese, and all the colonial officials fled Malaya. Kuala Lumpur was captured by the Imperial Japanese Army on 11 January 1942. Despite suffering little damage during the battle, the wartime occupation of the city resulted in significant loss of lives; at least 5,000 Chinese were killed in Kuala Lumpur in just a few weeks of occupation by Japanese forces, and thousands of Indians were sent as forced labour to work on the Burma Railway where many died. They occupied the city until 15 August 1945, when the commander in chief of the Japanese Seventh Area Army in Singapore and Malaysia, Seishirō Itagaki, surrendered to the British administration following the atomic bombings of Hiroshima and Nagasaki. Kuala Lumpur grew during the war, and continued after the war during the Malayan Emergency (1948–1960), during which Malaya was preoccupied with a communist insurgency and New Villages were established on the outskirts of the city.

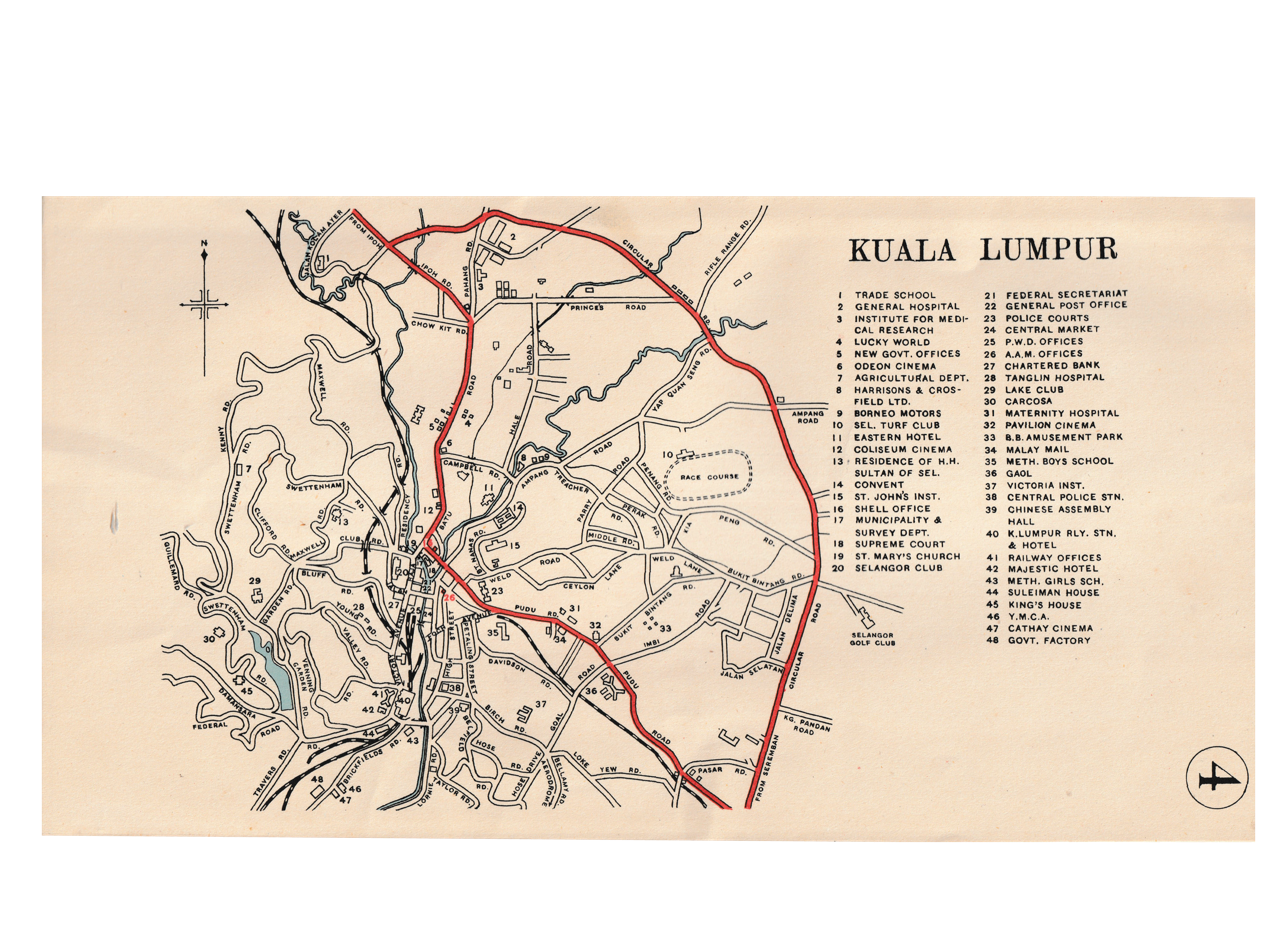
Map of Kuala Lumpur in 1951

The first municipal election in Kuala Lumpur was held on 16 February 1952. An ad hoc alliance between the Malay UMNO and Chinese MCA party candidates won a majority of the seats, and this led to the formation of the Alliance Party (later the Barisan Nasional). On 31 August 1957, the Federation of Malaya gained its independence from British rule. The British flag was lowered and the Malayan flag raised for the first time at the Padang at midnight on 30 August 1957, and on the morning of 31 August, the ceremony for the Declaration of Independence was held at the Merdeka Stadium by the first Prime Minister of Malaya, Tunku Abdul Rahman. Kuala Lumpur officially became the capital of the Malayan federation under the Federal Capital Act 1960 remained still after the formation of Malaysia on 16 September 1963. The Malaysian Houses of Parliament were completed at the edge of the Lake Gardens in 1963. The population of Kuala Lumpur expanded considerably from 1960 to 2018, doubling in size every 13 years.

The Majestic Theatre on Pudu Road was an early pioneer in Kuala Lumpur's cinema scene. It was converted into an amusement park in the 1990s and demolished in 2009.

Kuala Lumpur has seen several civil disturbances over the years. A riot in 1897 was a relatively minor affair that began with the confiscation of faulty dacing (a scale used by traders), and in 1912, a more serious disturbance called the tauchang riot began during the Chinese New Year with the cutting of pigtails and ended with rioting and factional fighting lasting several days. The worst rioting on record in Malaysia, however, occurred on 13 May 1969, when race riots broke out in Kuala Lumpur. The so-called 13 May Incident included violent conflicts between members of the Malay and the Chinese communities, the result of Malays' dissatisfaction with their socio-political status. The riots caused the deaths of 196 people, according to official figures, and led to major changes in the country's economic policy to promote and prioritise Malay economic development over that of other ethnicities.

==== City, Federal Territory, Greater Kuala Lumpur ====
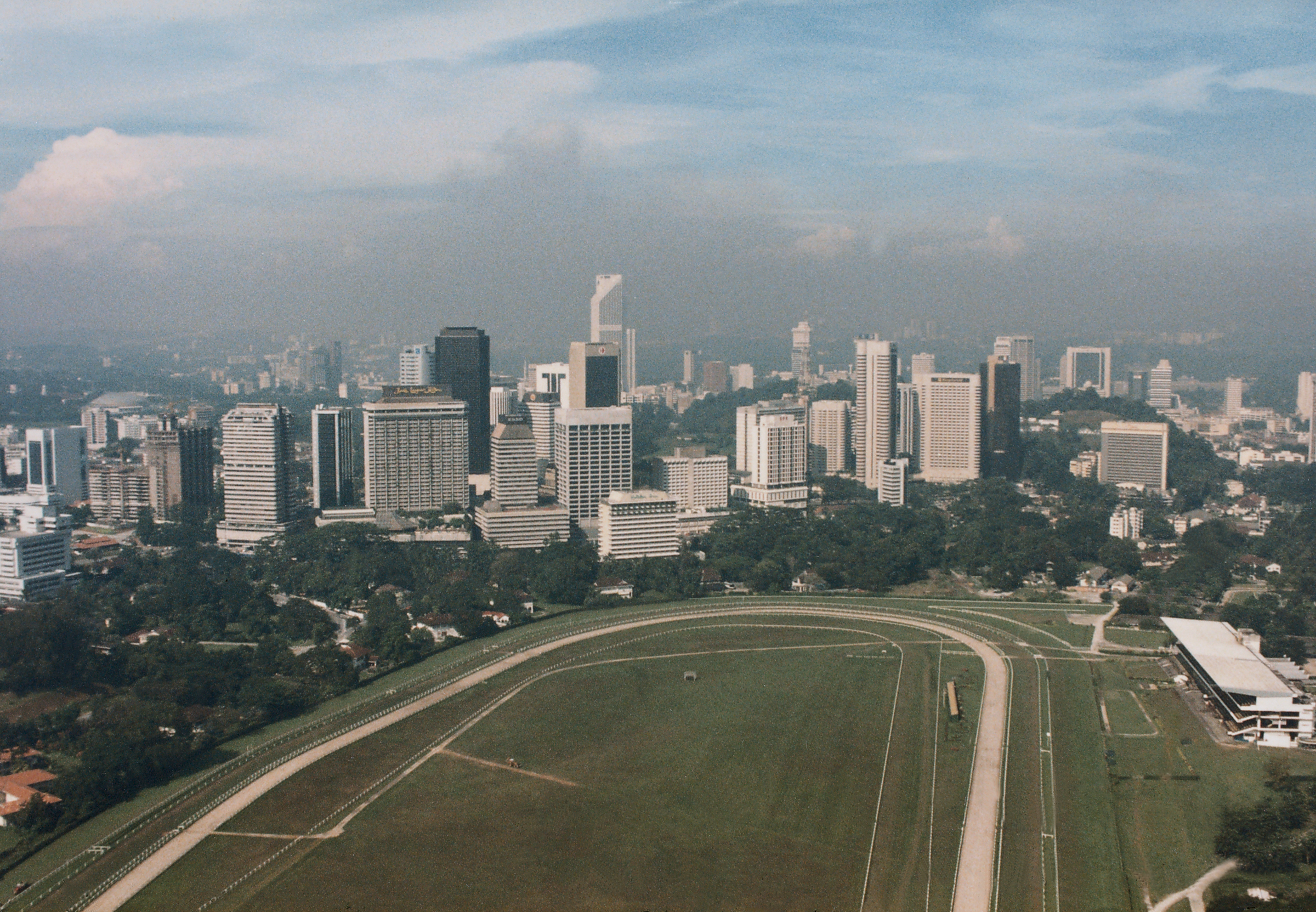
Kuala Lumpur cityscape in 1987 before KLCC was created. The race track in the foreground was replaced by the Petronas Towers and KLCC Park in 1998.

Kuala Lumpur achieved city status on 1 February 1972, becoming the first settlement in Malaysia to be granted the status after independence. Later, on 1 February 1974, Kuala Lumpur became a federal territory. The territory of Kuala Lumpur expanded to 96 square miles by absorbing the surrounding areas. Kuala Lumpur was ceded by Selangor to be directly controlled by the central government, and it ceased to be capital of Selangor in 1978 after the city of Shah Alam was declared the new state capital. On 14 May 1990, Kuala Lumpur celebrated the centennial of the local council. The new federal territory Kuala Lumpur flag and anthem were introduced. Putrajaya was declared a Federal Territory on 1 February 2001, as well as the seat of the federal government. The administrative and judicial functions of the government were shifted from Kuala Lumpur to Putrajaya. Kuala Lumpur however still retained its legislative function, and remained the home of the Yang di-Pertuan Agong (Constitutional King).

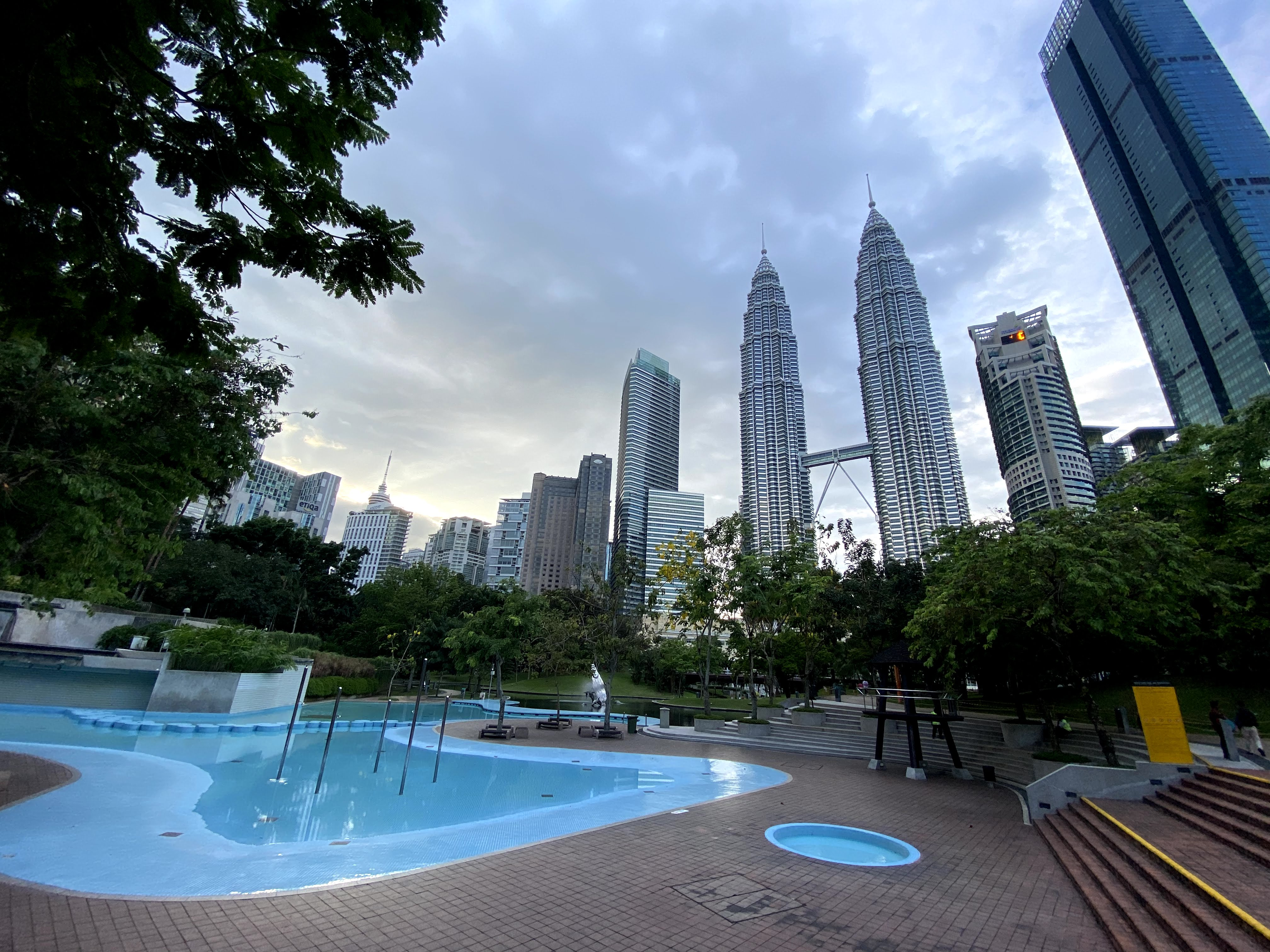
The Kuala Lumpur City Centre (KLCC) in 2020

From the 1990s onwards, major urban developments in the Klang Valley extended the Kuala Lumpur metropolitan area. This area, known as Greater Kuala Lumpur, extends from the Federal Territory of Kuala Lumpur westward to Port Klang, east to the edge of the Titiwangsa Mountains as well as to the north and south. The area covers other administratively separate towns and cities such as Klang, Shah Alam, Putrajaya and others, and is served by the Klang Valley Integrated Transit System. Notable projects undertaken within Kuala Lumpur itself included the development of a new Kuala Lumpur City Centre around Jalan Ampang and the Petronas Towers, once the world's tallest buildings. The Petronas Towers has since been superseded as the tallest buildings in Kuala Lumpur by The Exchange 106 and Merdeka 118, which is the second tallest building in the world after the Burj Khalifa in Dubai.

== Geography ==
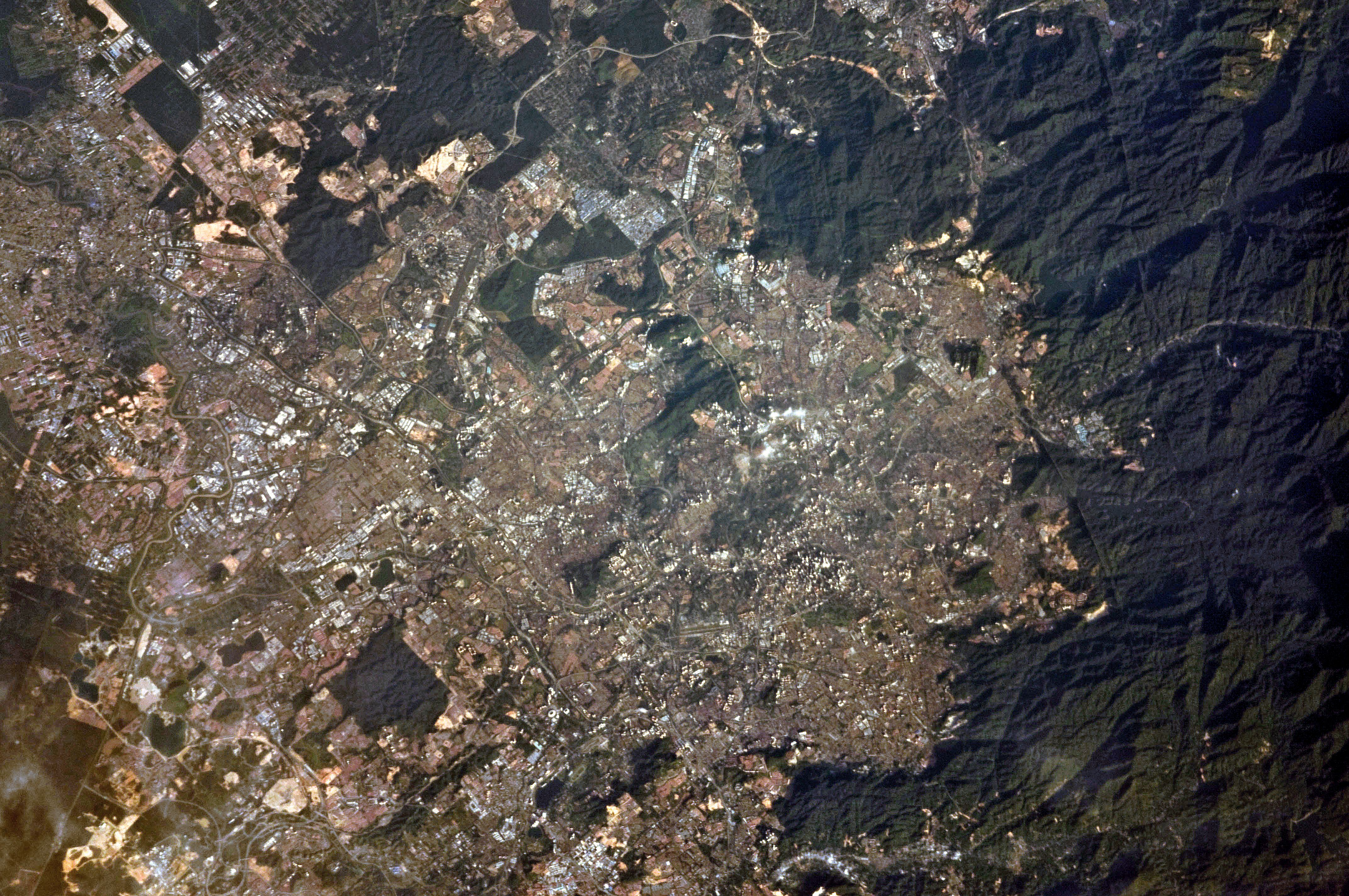
A satellite view of Klang Valley or Greater Kuala Lumpur

The geography of Kuala Lumpur is characterised by the huge Klang Valley, bordered by the Titiwangsa Mountains in the east, several minor ranges in the north and the south, and the Strait of Malacca in the west. Kuala Lumpur is a Malay term that translates to "muddy confluence" and is located at the confluence of the Klang and Gombak rivers which flow into the Selangor River.

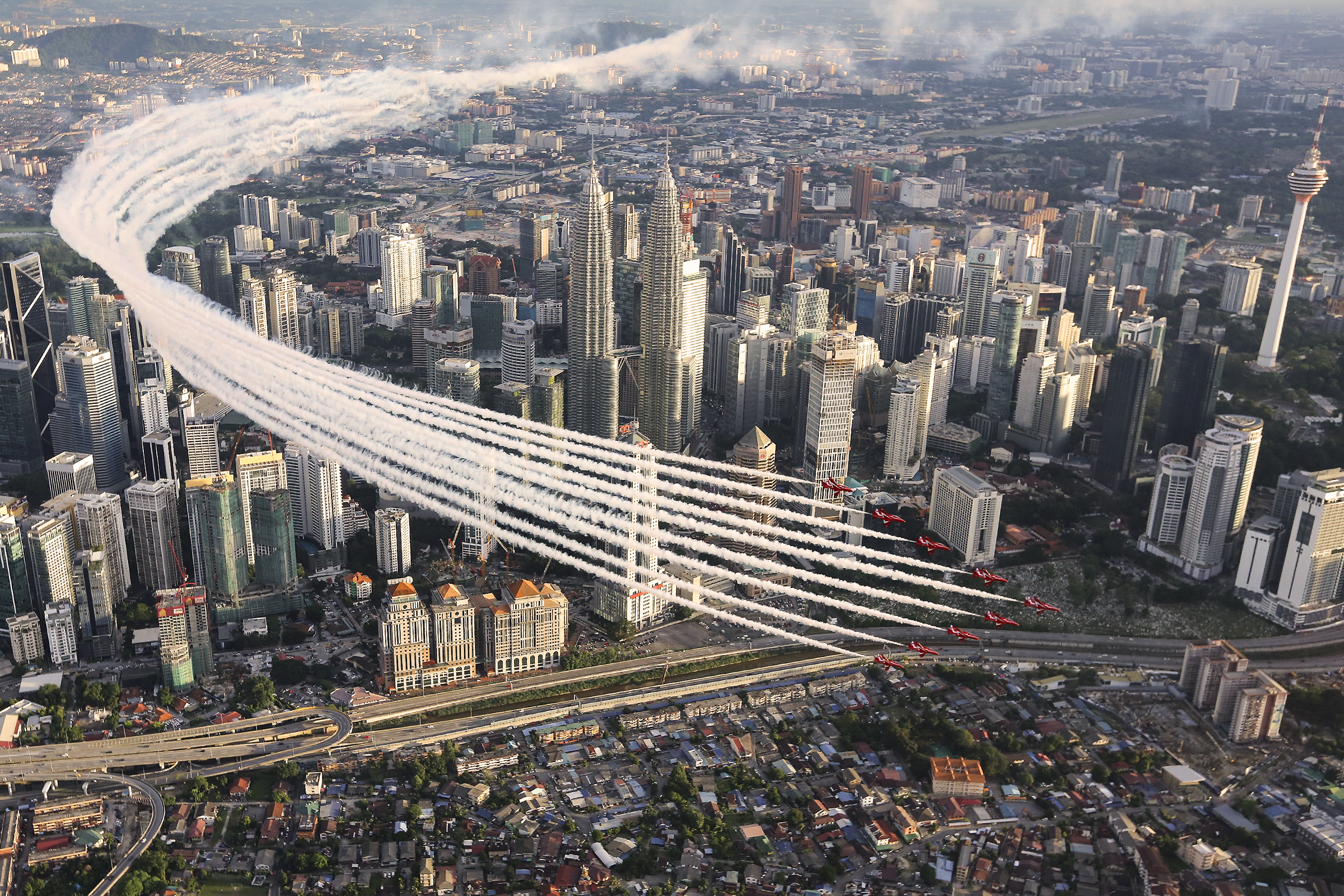
The British Red Arrows flying over the city in 2016

Located in the centre of Selangor state, Kuala Lumpur was a territory of Selangor State Government. In 1974, Kuala Lumpur was split off from Selangor to form the first Federal Territory governed directly by the Malaysian federal government. Its location in the most developed state on the west coast of peninsular Malaysia, which has a wider stretch of flat land than the east coast, has helped it develop faster than other cities in Malaysia. The municipality covers an area of 243 km^{2} (94 sq mi), with an average elevation of 81.95 m (268 ft 10 in) highest point being Bukit Nanas at 94 meters above sea level.

=== Climate ===
Kuala Lumpur

Climate chart (precipitation, max. and min. temperature)
J	F	M	A	M	J	J	A	S	O	N	D
227 33 24	193 33 24	270 34 25	302 34 25	230 34 25	146 33 25	165 33 24	174 33 25	220 33 24	284 33 24	356 32 24	281 32 24
- █ Average max. and min. temperatures in °C
- █ Precipitation totals in mm
Imperial conversion
J	F	M	A	M	J	J	A	S	O	N	D
8.9 91 75	7.6 92 75	11 93 76	12 93 76	9.1 92 77	5.7 92 77	6.5 91 76	6.9 91 76	8.7 91 76	11 91 76	14 90 75	11 90 75
- █ Average max. and min. temperatures in °F
- █ Precipitation totals in inches

Protected by the Titiwangsa Range in the east and Indonesia's Sumatra Island in the west, Kuala Lumpur is sheltered from strong winds and has a tropical rainforest climate (Köppen climate classification Af), hot, humid and sunny, with abundant rainfall, especially during the northeast monsoon season from October to March. Temperatures tend to remain constant. Maximums hover between 32 and 35 °C (90 and 95 °F) and sometimes topping 38 °C (100.4 °F), while minimums hover between 23.4 and 24.6 °C (74.1 and 76.3 °F) and have never fallen below 17.8 °C (64.0 °F). Kuala Lumpur typically receives at least 2,600 mm (100 in) of rain annually; June to August are relatively dry, but even then rainfall typically exceeds 131 millimetres (5.2 in) a month. Kuala Lumpur is highly prone to severe thunderstorms and lightning strikes. The Klang Valley, including Kuala Lumpur, is one of the places where thunderstorms are most frequently observed on Earth.

Floods are frequent in Kuala Lumpur after heavy downpours, especially in the city centre, because irrigation structure lags behind the intense development in the city. Smoke from forest fires in nearby Sumatra and Kalimantan sometimes casts a haze over the region, and is a major source of pollution, along with open burning, motor vehicle emissions, and construction.

Climate data for Kuala Lumpur (Sultan Abdul Aziz Shah Airport) (1991–2020 normals, extremes 1963–2020)
Month	Jan	Feb	Mar	Apr	May	Jun	Jul	Aug	Sep	Oct	Nov	Dec	Year
Record high °C (°F)	38.0 (100.4)	36.7 (98.1)	37.9 (100.2)	37.2 (99.0)	38.5 (101.3)	36.6 (97.9)	36.7 (98.1)	38.0 (100.4)	35.9 (96.6)	37.0 (98.6)	36.0 (96.8)	35.5 (95.9)	38.5 (101.3)
Mean daily maximum °C (°F)	32.6 (90.7)	33.3 (91.9)	33.7 (92.7)	33.7 (92.7)	33.6 (92.5)	33.3 (91.9)	32.8 (91.0)	32.8 (91.0)	32.7 (90.9)	32.6 (90.7)	32.3 (90.1)	32.0 (89.6)	32.9 (91.2)
Daily mean °C (°F)	27.3 (81.1)	27.8 (82.0)	28.1 (82.6)	28.1 (82.6)	28.5 (83.3)	28.4 (83.1)	28.0 (82.4)	28.0 (82.4)	27.7 (81.9)	27.5 (81.5)	27.1 (80.8)	27.1 (80.8)	27.8 (82.0)
Mean daily minimum °C (°F)	23.8 (74.8)	24.0 (75.2)	24.5 (76.1)	24.7 (76.5)	25.0 (77.0)	24.8 (76.6)	24.4 (75.9)	24.5 (76.1)	24.2 (75.6)	24.2 (75.6)	24.1 (75.4)	24.0 (75.2)	24.4 (75.9)
Record low °C (°F)	17.8 (64.0)	18.0 (64.4)	18.9 (66.0)	20.6 (69.1)	20.5 (68.9)	19.1 (66.4)	20.1 (68.2)	20.0 (68.0)	21.0 (69.8)	20.0 (68.0)	20.7 (69.3)	19.0 (66.2)	17.8 (64.0)
Average precipitation mm (inches)	226.7 (8.93)	192.8 (7.59)	270.4 (10.65)	301.5 (11.87)	229.9 (9.05)	145.8 (5.74)	165.2 (6.50)	174.3 (6.86)	220.3 (8.67)	283.8 (11.17)	355.8 (14.01)	280.6 (11.05)	2,847.1 (112.09)
Average precipitation days (≥ 1.0 mm)	13.6	11.9	15.0	16.8	13.2	9.6	10.6	10.9	13.3	16.3	19.7	16.3	167.2
Average relative humidity (%)	80	80	80	82	81	80	79	79	81	82	84	83	81
Mean monthly sunshine hours	185.0	192.4	207.9	198.8	206.8	194.4	200.2	189.0	163.8	169.1	152.3	162.6	2,222.3
Source 1: World Meteorological Organization
Source 2: Pogodaiklimat.ru NOAA (sunshine hours, 1961–1990)

Climate data for Kuala Lumpur
Month	Jan	Feb	Mar	Apr	May	Jun	Jul	Aug	Sep	Oct	Nov	Dec	Year
Mean daily daylight hours	12.0	12.0	12.1	12.2	12.3	12.3	12.3	12.2	12.1	12.0	12.0	11.9	12.1
Average Ultraviolet index	6	7	7	7	7	7	7	7	7	7	7	7	7
Source: Weather Atlas

== Governance ==
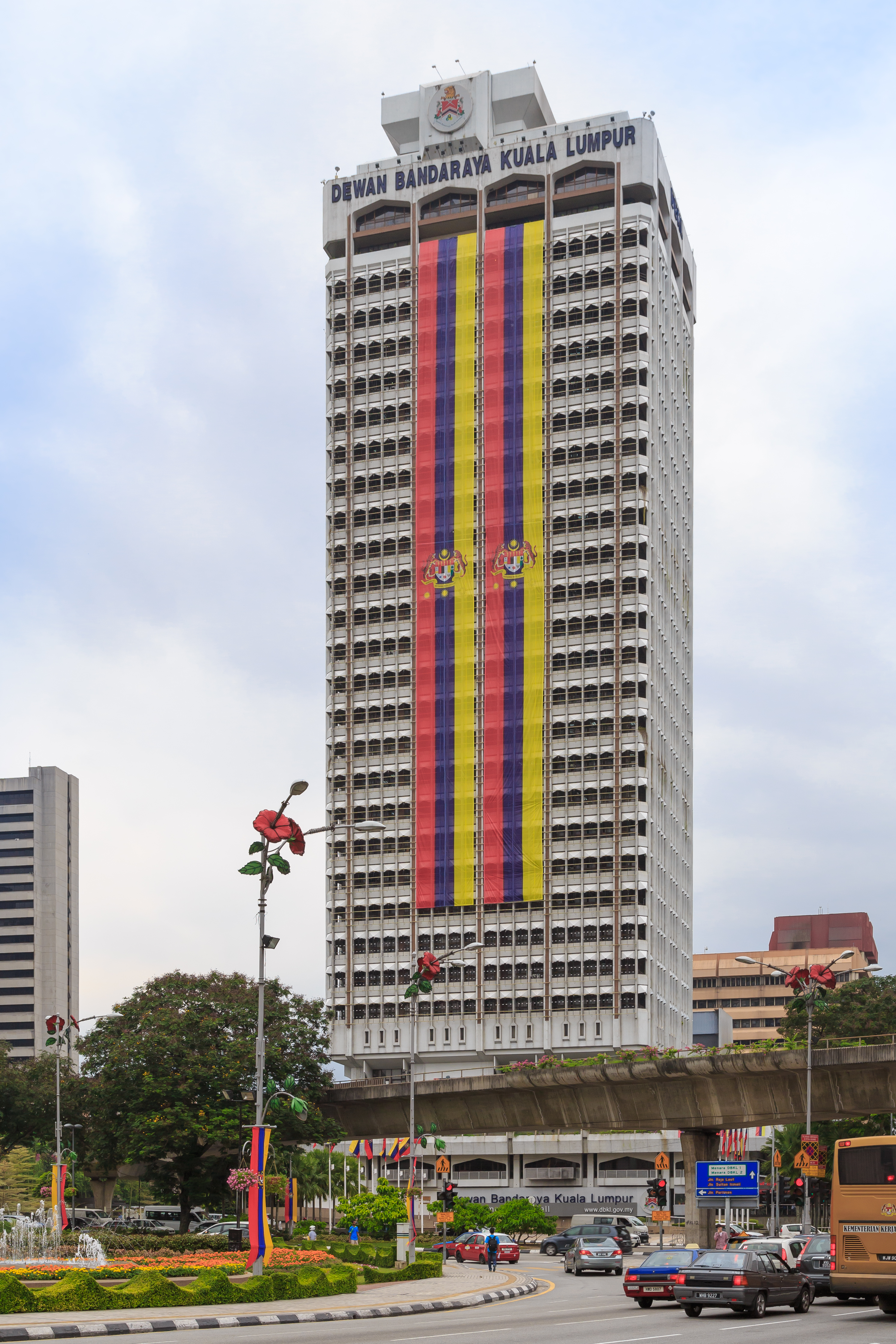
Kuala Lumpur City Hall

Kuala Lumpur was administered by a corporation sole called the Federal Capital Commissioner from 1 April 1961, until it was awarded city status in 1972, after which executive power transferred to the Lord Mayor (Datuk Bandar). 15 mayors have been appointed since then. The current mayor is Maimunah Mohd Sharif, who has been in office since 15 August 2024.

=== Local government ===
The local administration is carried out by the Kuala Lumpur City Hall, an agency under the Federal Territories Ministry of Malaysia. It is responsible for public health and sanitation, waste removal and management, town planning, environmental protection and building control, social and economic development, and general maintenance functions of urban infrastructure. Executive power lies with the mayor in the city hall, who is appointed for three years by the Federal Territories Minister. This system of appointing the mayor has been in place ever since the local government elections were suspended in 1970.

=== Districts ===
Kuala Lumpur's eleven parliamentary constituencies, with 2020 population, area, density and percentage of the total are congruent with administrative subdivisions under the authority of the Kuala Lumpur City Hall authority.

A map of Kuala Lumpur with the locations of the city centre and its suburbs.

Local authority		Population (% of total population)	Area (km²) (% of total area)	Density		
Code	Name	Population (% of total population)	Area (km²) (% of total area)	Density		
Code	Name	P.114	Kepong	106,199 (5.36%)	12 (4.9%)	8,850
P.115	Batu	219,132 (11.06%)	20 (8.2%)	10,956		
P.116	Wangsa Maju	215,870 (10.89%)	16 (6.6%)	13,491		
P.117	Segambut	253,715 (12.89%)	51 (21%)	4,974		
P.118	Setiawangsa	147,095 (7.42%)	16 (6.6%)	9,193		
P.119	Titiwangsa	122,096 (6.16%)	15 (6.2%)	8,139		
P.120	Bukit Bintang	120,259 (6.07%)	21 (8.6%)	5,726		
P.121	Lembah Pantai	148,094 (7.47%)	20 (8.2%)	7,404		
P.122	Seputeh	322,511 (16.27%)	31 (12.8%)	10,403		
P.123	Cheras	135,823 (6.85%)	16 (6.6%)	8,488		
P.124	Bandar Tun Razak	191,318 (9.65%)	25 (10.3%)	7,652		
Total		1,982,112 (100%)	243 (100%)	8,156		

=== Mukims ===
Mukims of the Federal Territory of Kuala Lumpur

For land administration purposes, the Federal Territory of Kuala Lumpur is divided into eight mukims, and several mukim-level towns (pekan/bandar):

Mukim	Corresponding parliament	Areas included
Bandar Kuala Lumpur	Bukit Bintang; Titiwangsa (partial); Lembah Pantai (partial); Cheras (partial); Batu (partial); Setiawangsa (federal)	Kuala Lumpur central business district Kampung Baru; Titiwangsa; Sentul; Maluri; Pudu; Brickfields; Mid Valley City; Bukit Tunku; Perdana Botanical Gardens and Cenotaph
Mukim Kuala Lumpur (Suburban district)	Cheras; Bandar Tun Razak (partial); Lembah Pantai (partial); Segambut (partial); Seputeh (partial)	Cheras; Shamelin Perkasa (partial); Bandar Tun Razak; Salak South; Bangsar; University of Malaya; Pantai Dalam; Jalan Klang Lama (Taman Desa); Bukit Damansara; Sri Hartamas and Taman Duta; Istana Negara; Taman Tun Dr Ismail; Kampung Sungai Penchala
Mukim Petaling	Seputeh; Bandar Tun Razak; Cheras (partial)	Jalan Klang Lama (Taman OUG & Kuchai Lama) Sri Petaling; Bukit Jalil; Bandar Tasik Selatan; Sungai Besi
Mukim Batu	Batu; Kepong; Segambut (partial)	Kepong; Jinjang; Segambut; Mont Kiara; Batu; Jalan Ipoh; Sentul (partial); Taman Wahyu
Mukim Setapak	Wangsa Maju; Setiawangsa	Setapak; Wangsa Maju; Taman Melati; Setiawangsa (partial)
Mukim Ampang	Titiwangsa; Cheras (partial)	Kampung Pandan; Ampang; Kampung Datuk Keramat; Cochrane (partial); Maluri (partial); Cheras (partial)
Mukim Ulu Kelang	Setiawangsa	Setiawangsa
Mukim Cheras (Alam Damai)	Cheras; Bandar Tun Razak	Alam Damai; Taman Connaught

=== Politics ===
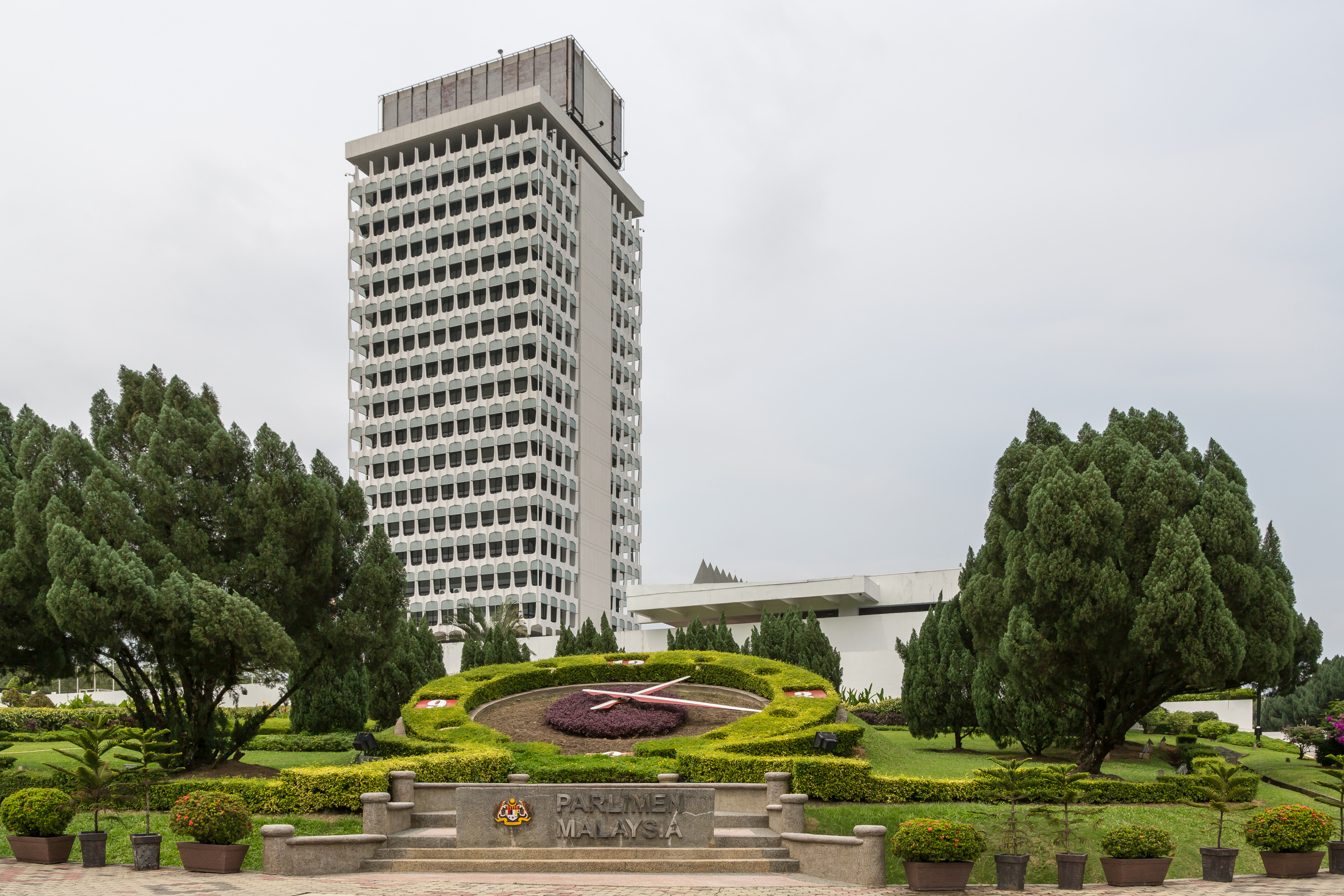
The Malaysia Parliament House (Bangunan Parlimen Malaysia), located at the end of Jalan Parlimen

Members of Parliament for Kuala Lumpur Malaysian general election, 2022 Map
- DAP (PH): 5 / 11
- PKR (PH): 5 / 11
- UMNO (BN): 1 / 11

Kuala Lumpur is home to the Parliament of Malaysia. The federal Constitution stipulates the three branches of the Malaysian government: the Executive, Judiciary and Legislative branches. The Parliament consists of the Dewan Negara (Upper House / House of Senate) and Dewan Rakyat (Lower House / House of Representatives).

List of Kuala Lumpur representatives in the Federal Parliament (Dewan Rakyat)

Parliament	Seat Name	Member of Parliament	Party
P114	Kepong	Lim Lip Eng	Pakatan Harapan (DAP)
P115	Batu	Prabakaran Parameswaran	Pakatan Harapan (PKR)
P116	Wangsa Maju	Zahir Hassan	Pakatan Harapan (PKR)
P117	Segambut	Hannah Yeoh Tseow Suan	Pakatan Harapan (DAP)
P118	Setiawangsa	Nik Nazmi Nik Ahmad	Pakatan Harapan (PKR)
P119	Titiwangsa	Johari Abdul Ghani	Barisan Nasional (UMNO)
P120	Bukit Bintang	Fong Kui Lun	Pakatan Harapan (DAP)
P121	Lembah Pantai	Ahmad Fahmi Mohamed Fadzil	Pakatan Harapan (PKR)
P122	Seputeh	Teresa Kok Suh Sim	Pakatan Harapan (DAP)
P123	Cheras	Tan Kok Wai	Pakatan Harapan (DAP)
P124	Bandar Tun Razak	Wan Azizah Wan Ismail	Pakatan Harapan (PKR)

The Kuala Lumpur City Hall (DBKL) acts as the sole local government in Kuala Lumpur.

== Economy ==
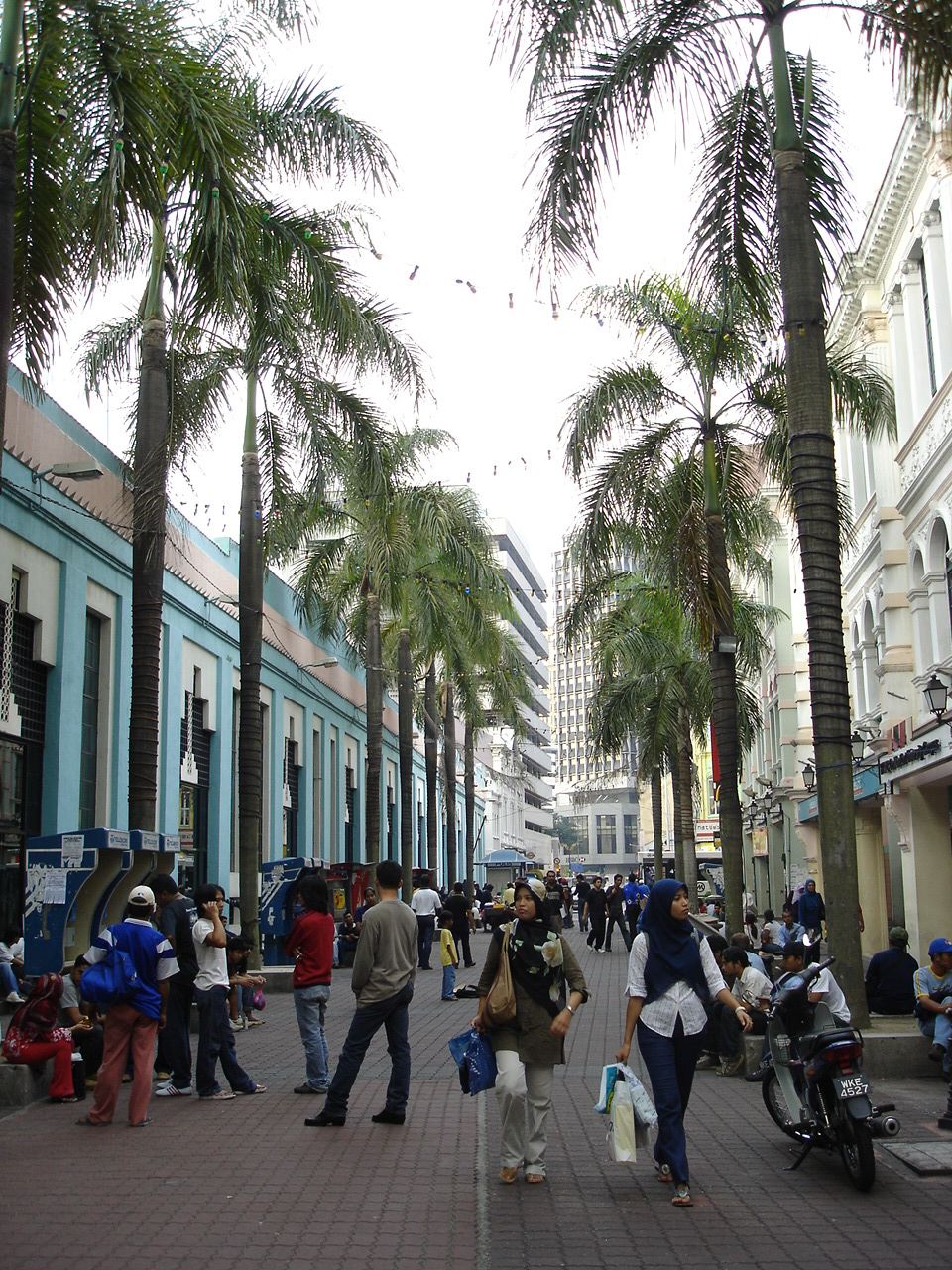
A pedestrian mall by the Central Market

Kuala Lumpur and its surrounding urban areas form the most industrialised and economically fastest-growing region in Malaysia.

Despite the relocation of federal government administration to Putrajaya, certain government institutions such as Bank Negara Malaysia (National Bank of Malaysia), Companies Commission of Malaysia and Securities Commission as well as most embassies and diplomatic missions have remained in the city. The city remains the economic and business hub of the country. Kuala Lumpur is a centre for finance, insurance, real estate, media and the arts of Malaysia. Kuala Lumpur is rated the only global city in Malaysia, according to the Globalization and World Cities Study Group and Network (GaWC).

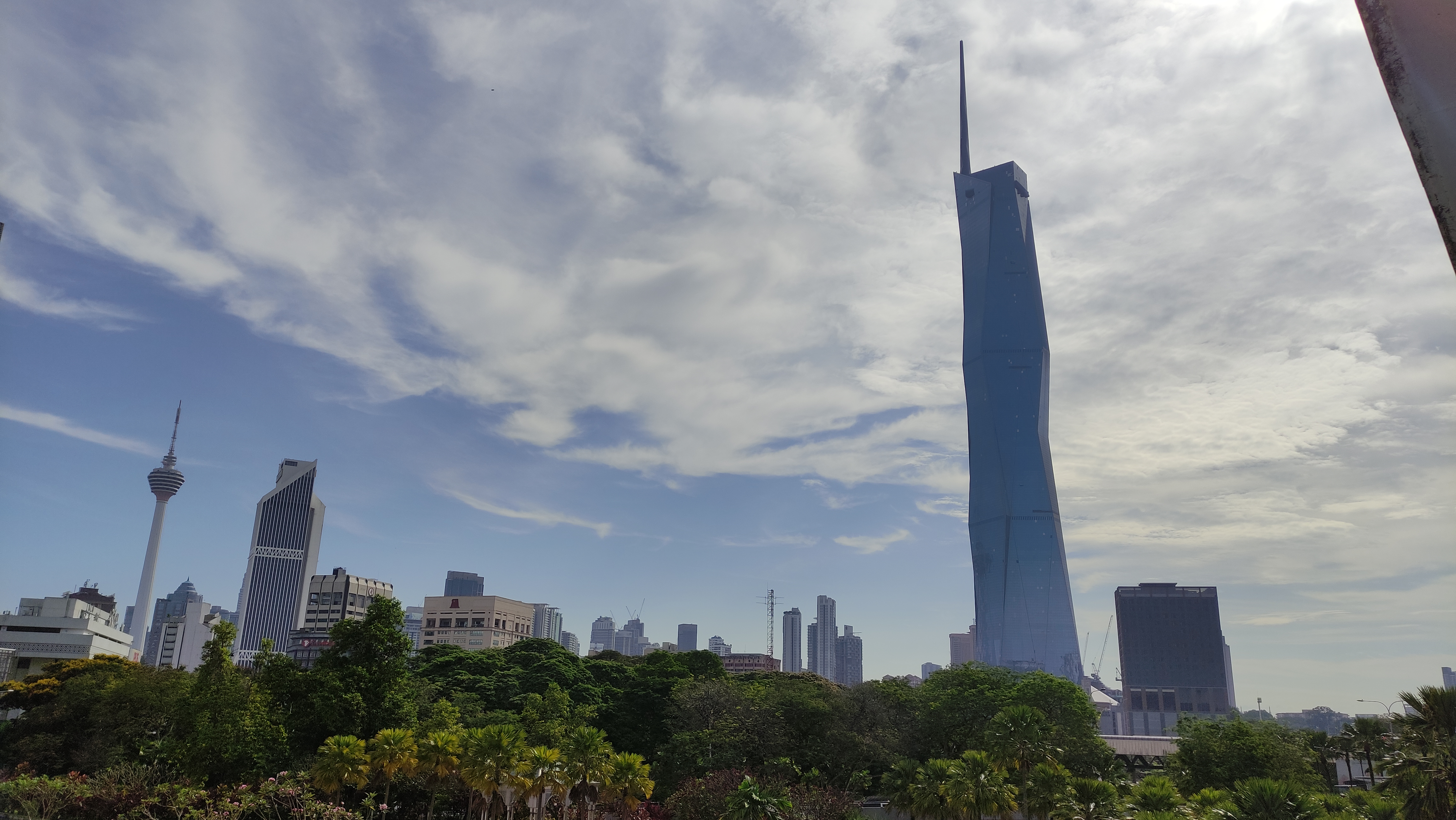
The Merdeka 118 is the tallest building in Southeast Asia; it is also the second-tallest building in the world, after the Burj Khalifa.

Bursa Malaysia, or the Malaysia Exchange, is based in the city and forms one of its core economic activities. As of 5 July 2013, the market capitalisation stood at US$505.67 billion. The gross domestic product (GDP) for Kuala Lumpur is estimated at RM73,536 million in 2008 with an average annual growth rate of 5.9 per cent. By 2015, the GDP had reached RM160,388 million, representing 15.1% of the total GDP of Malaysia. The per capita GDP for Kuala Lumpur in 2013 was RM79,752 with an average annual growth rate of 5.6 per cent, and RM94,722 in 2015. Average monthly household income is RM9,073 (~$2,200) as of 2016, growing at a pace of approximately 6% a year. The service sector, comprising finance, insurance, real estate, business services, wholesale and retail trade, restaurants and hotels, transport, storage and communication, utilities, personal services and government services form the largest component of employment, representing about 83.0 per cent of the total. The remaining 17 per cent comes from manufacturing and construction.

The large service sector is evident in the number of local and foreign banks and insurance companies operating in the city. Kuala Lumpur is poised to become the global Islamic financing hub with an increasing number of financial institutions providing Islamic financing and the strong presence of Gulf financial institutions such as the world's largest Islamic bank, the Al-Rajhi Bank and Kuwait Finance House. Apart from that, the Dow Jones & Company is keen to work with Bursa Malaysia to set up Islamic Exchange Trade Funds (ETFs), which would help raise Malaysia's profile in the Gulf. The city has a large number of foreign corporations and is also host to many multi national companies' regional offices or support centres, particularly for finance and accounting, and information technology functions. Most of the country's largest companies have their headquarters here, and as of December 2007 and excluding Petronas, there are 14 companies listed in Forbes 2000 based in Kuala Lumpur.

There has been a growing emphasis on expanding the economic scope of the city in other service activities, such as research and development, which support the rest of the economy of Malaysia. Kuala Lumpur has been home for years to important research centres such as the Rubber Research Institute of Malaysia, the Forest Research Institute Malaysia and the Institute of Medical Research. A new financial district for Kuala Lumpur is currently under construction: the Tun Razak Exchange (TRX), formerly known as Kuala Lumpur International Financial District (KLIFD). The TRX's landmark and prominent building is The Exchange 106 tower. The 70-acre development will be situated in the heart of Kuala Lumpur and will serve international finance and business opportunities. The new financial hub is a strategic enabler of the Malaysian government's Economic Transformation Programme (ETP), an initiative by the Malaysian government to turn Malaysia into a high income economy nation.

=== Tourism ===
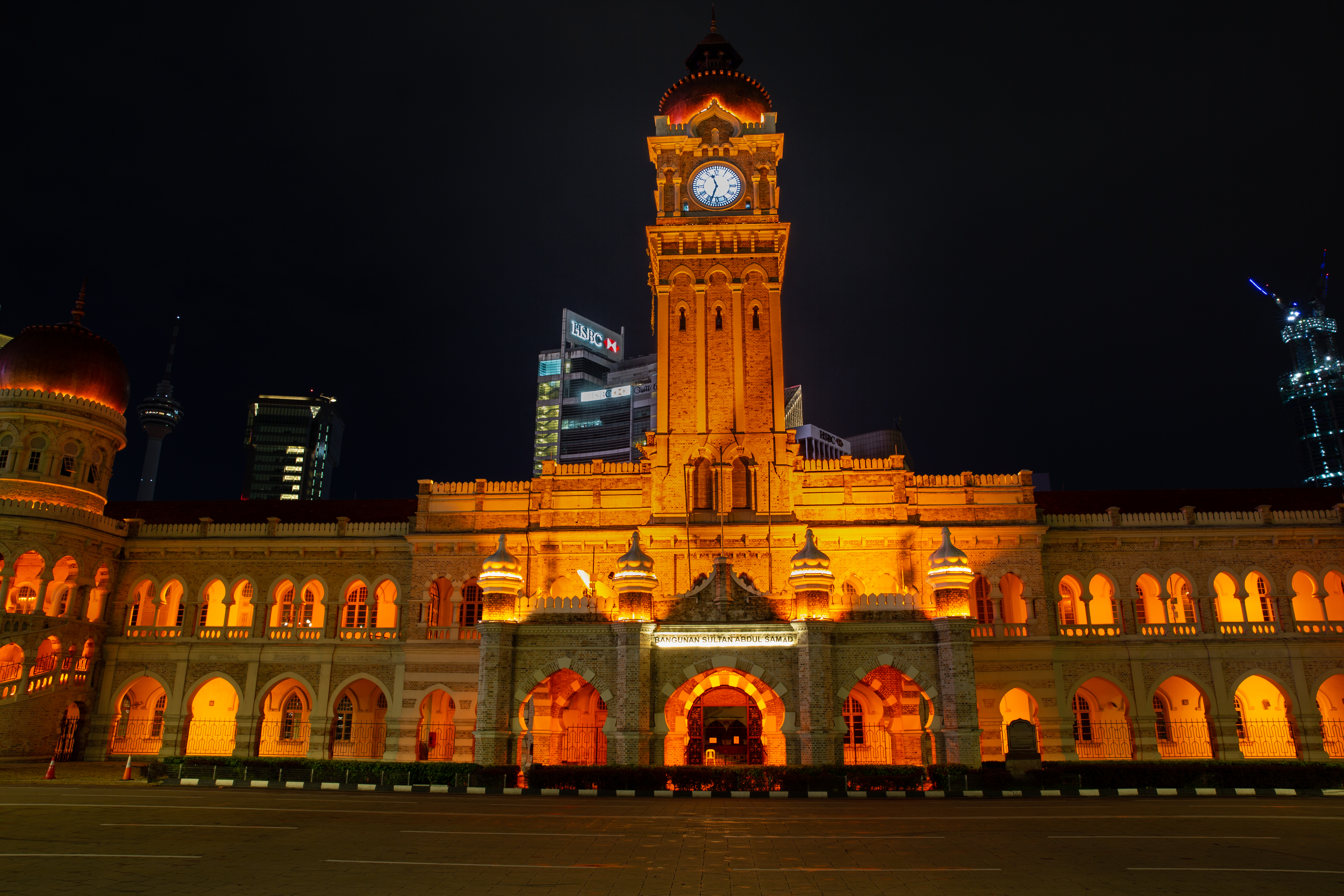
Sultan Abdul Samad Building, a historic building designed in the Moorish style and formerly housed various government offices

Tourism plays an important role in the city's service-driven economy. Many large worldwide hotel chains have a presence in the city. One of the oldest hotels is the Hotel Majestic. Kuala Lumpur is the sixth most visited city in the world, with 8.9 million tourists per year.

Tourism here is driven by the city's cultural diversity, relatively low costs, and wide gastronomic and shopping variety. MICE tourism, which mainly encompasses conventions, has expanded in recent years to become a vital component of the industry, and is expected to grow further once the Malaysian government's Economic Transformation Programme kicks in, and with the completion of a new 93,000 square meter-size MATRADE Centre in 2014. The MATRADE agency is also the owner of the Malaysia International Trade And Exhibition Centre (MITEC), the largest trade and exhibition centre of Malaysia, which is a component of the larger KL Metropolis development situated in the suburb of Segambut. Another notable trend is the increased presence of budget hotels in the city.

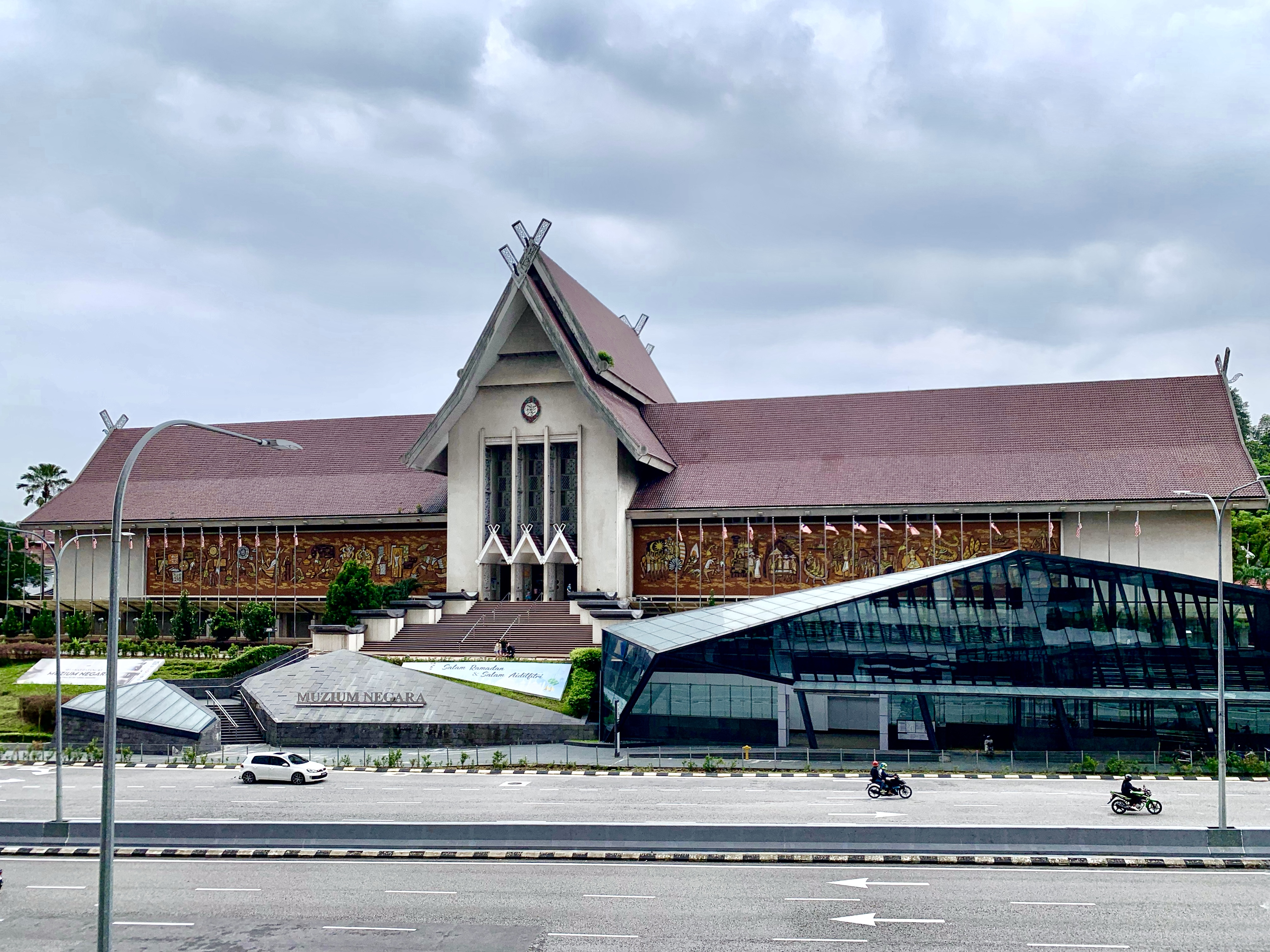
The National Museum of Malaysia, located along Jalan Damansara

The major tourist destinations in Kuala Lumpur include the Petronas Towers, the Bukit Bintang shopping district, the Kuala Lumpur Tower, Petaling Street (Chinatown), the Merdeka Square, the Kuala Lumpur railway station, the House of Parliament building, the National Palace (Istana Negara), the National Planetarium, the National Science Centre, the National Art Gallery (Balai Seni Negara), the National Theatre (Istana Budaya), the National Museum, the Royal Museum, the National Textile Museum, Islamic Arts Museum, Telekom Museum, Royal Malaysian Police Museum, the National Mosque of Malaysia (Masjid Negara), Federal Territory Mosque (Masjid Wilayah), Sultan Abdul Samad Building, DBKL City Theatre (Panggung Bandaraya), Medan Pasar, Central Market, KL Bird Park, KL Butterfly Park, Aquaria KLCC, Saloma Link (Pintasan Saloma), the National Monument, and religious sites such as the Sultan Abdul Samad Jamek Mosque, Thean Hou Temple and Buddhist Maha Vihara in Brickfields.

Kuala Lumpur plays host to many cultural festivals such as the Thaipusam procession at the Sri Mahamariamman Temple. Every year during the Thaipusam celebration, a silver chariot carrying the statue of Lord Muruga together with his consort Valli and Teivayanni would be paraded through the city beginning at the temple all the way to Batu Caves in the neighbouring Gombak, Selangor. The primary entertainment and shopping district of the city is mainly centred in the Golden Triangle encompassing Jalan P. Ramlee, Jalan Sultan Ismail, Jalan Bukit Bintang, Ampang Road and Bintang Walk.

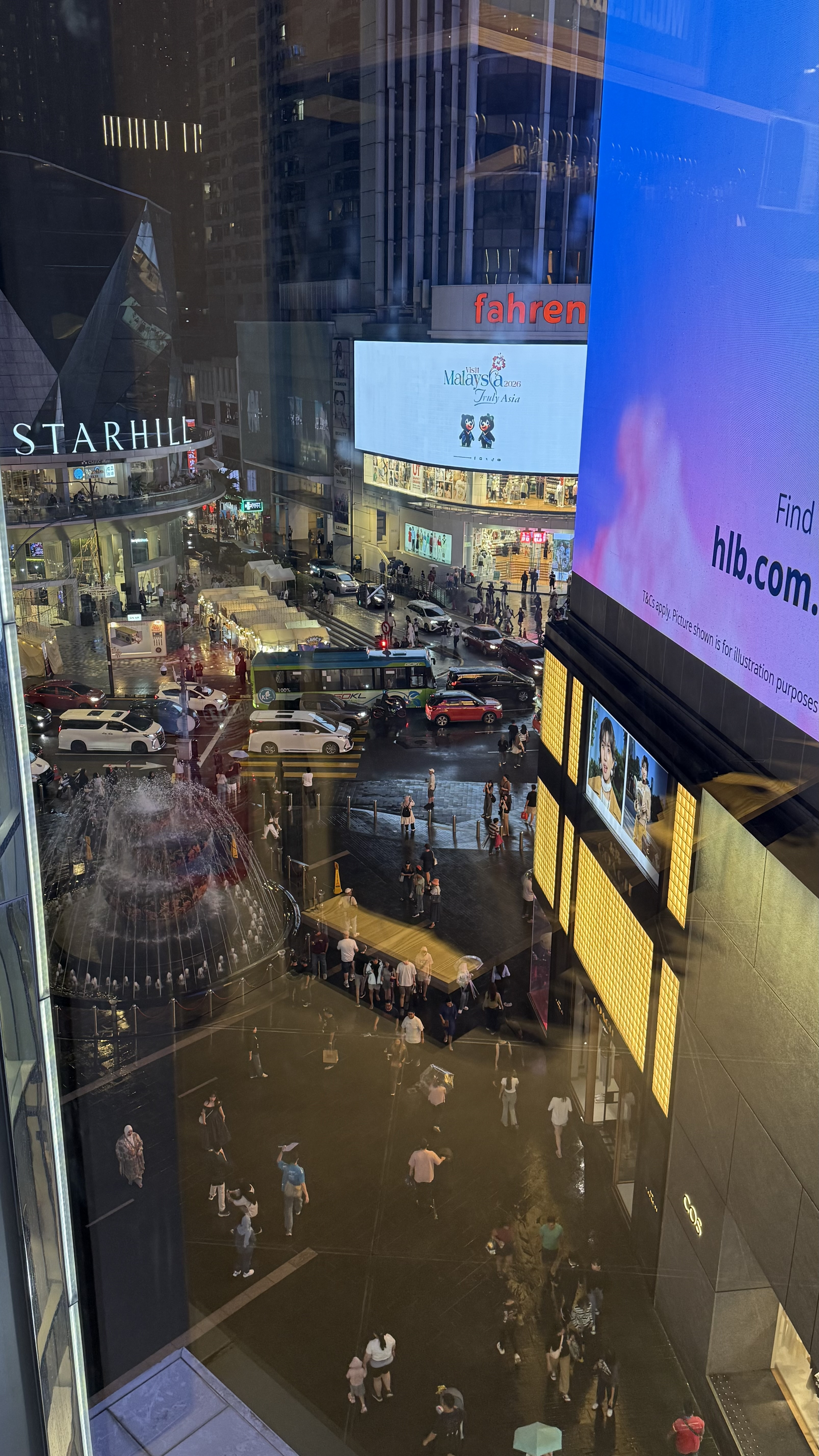
Bukit Bintang area taken from the Pavillion complex 9 May 2026

=== Retail ===
Kuala Lumpur alone has 66 shopping malls and is the retail and fashion hub of both Malaysia and Southeast Asia. Shopping in Malaysia contributed RM7.7 billion (US$2.26 billion) or 20.8 per cent of the RM31.9 billion tourism receipts in 2006.

Suria KLCC is one of Malaysia's premier upscale shopping destinations due to its location beneath the Petronas Towers. Apart from Suria KLCC, the Bukit Bintang district has the highest concentration of shopping malls in Kuala Lumpur. It includes: Pavilion KL, Fahrenheit 88, Plaza Low Yat, Berjaya Times Square, Lot 10, Sungei Wang Plaza, Starhill Gallery, Lalaport BBCC, Quill City Mall and Avenue K. Changkat area of Bukit Bintang hosts various cafes, alfresco dining outlets, illegal activities such as prostitution and more. It is best known as one of the red-light districts in Kuala Lumpur. Bangsar district also has a few shopping complexes, including Bangsar Village, Bangsar Shopping Centre, KL Gateway Mall, Bangsar South, KL Eco City Mall, The Gardens, and Mid Valley Megamall.

Apart from shopping complexes, Kuala Lumpur has designated numerous zones in the city to market locally manufactured products such as textiles, fabrics, and handicrafts, especially at Jalan Tuanku Abdul Rahman. Traditional clothing of ethnic Malays, such as baju Kurung and baju kebaya can be found here. The Chinatown of Kuala Lumpur, commonly known as Petaling Street, is one of them. Chinatown features many pre-independence buildings with Straits Chinese and colonial architectural influences.

Since 2000, the Malaysian Ministry of Tourism has introduced a mega sale event for shopping in Malaysia. The mega sale event is held three times a year – in March, May and December – in which all shopping malls are encouraged to participate to boost Kuala Lumpur as a leading shopping destination in Asia, which has been maintained until present with new mega sales.

Gallery

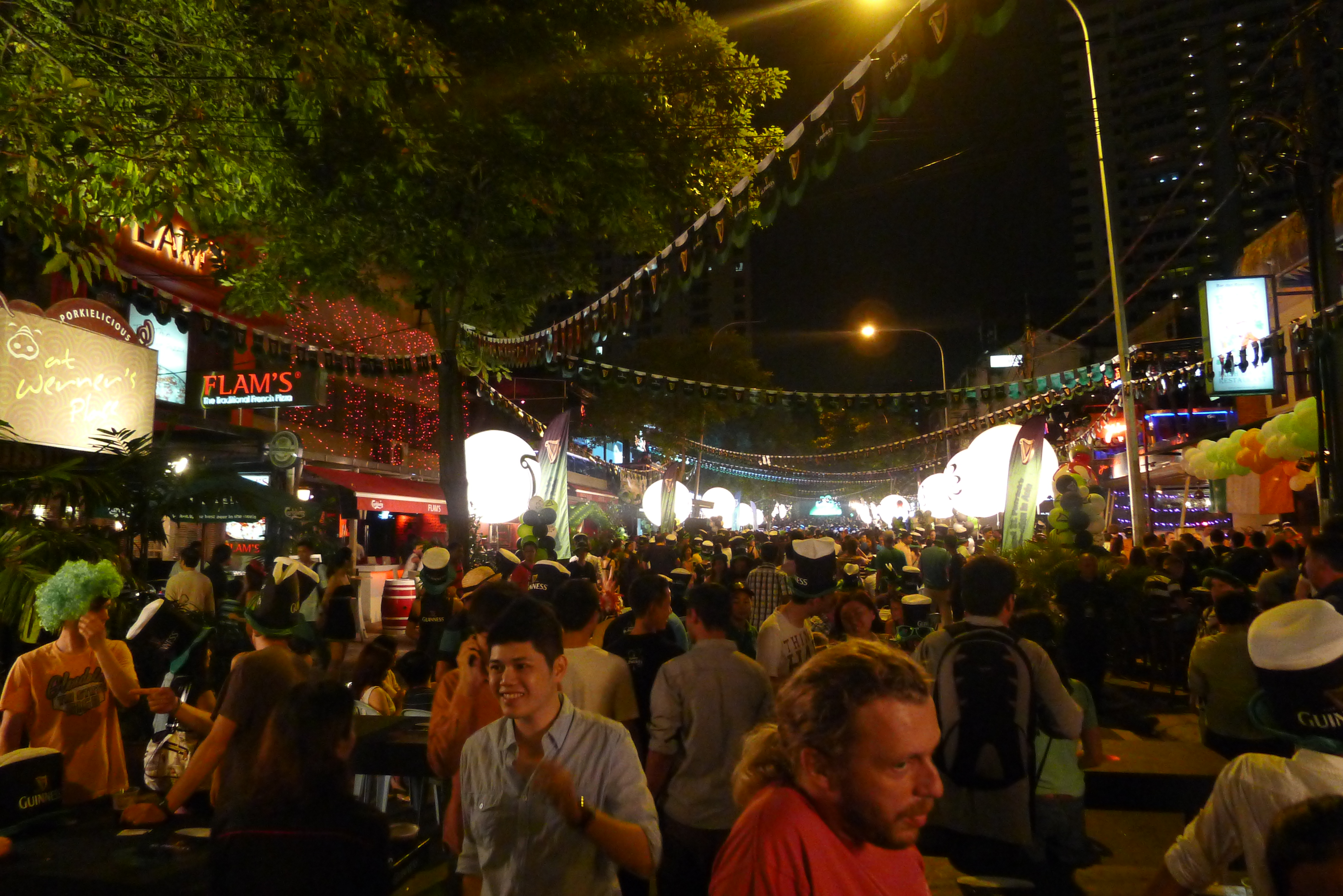
Changkat Bukit Bintang, an upmarket gastronomy area and red light district in Kuala Lumpur at night

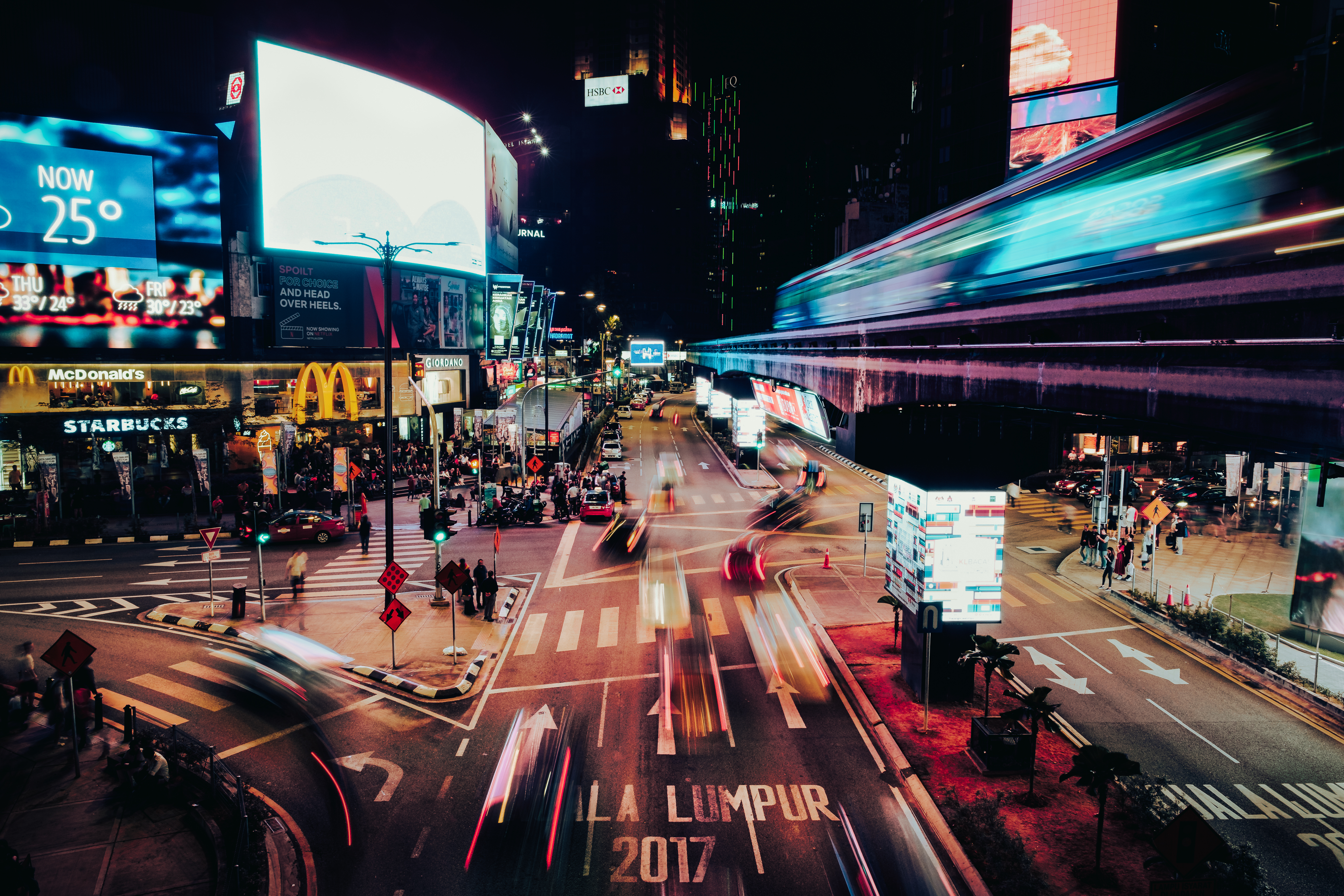
Bukit Bintang, Kuala Lumpur's retail cluster

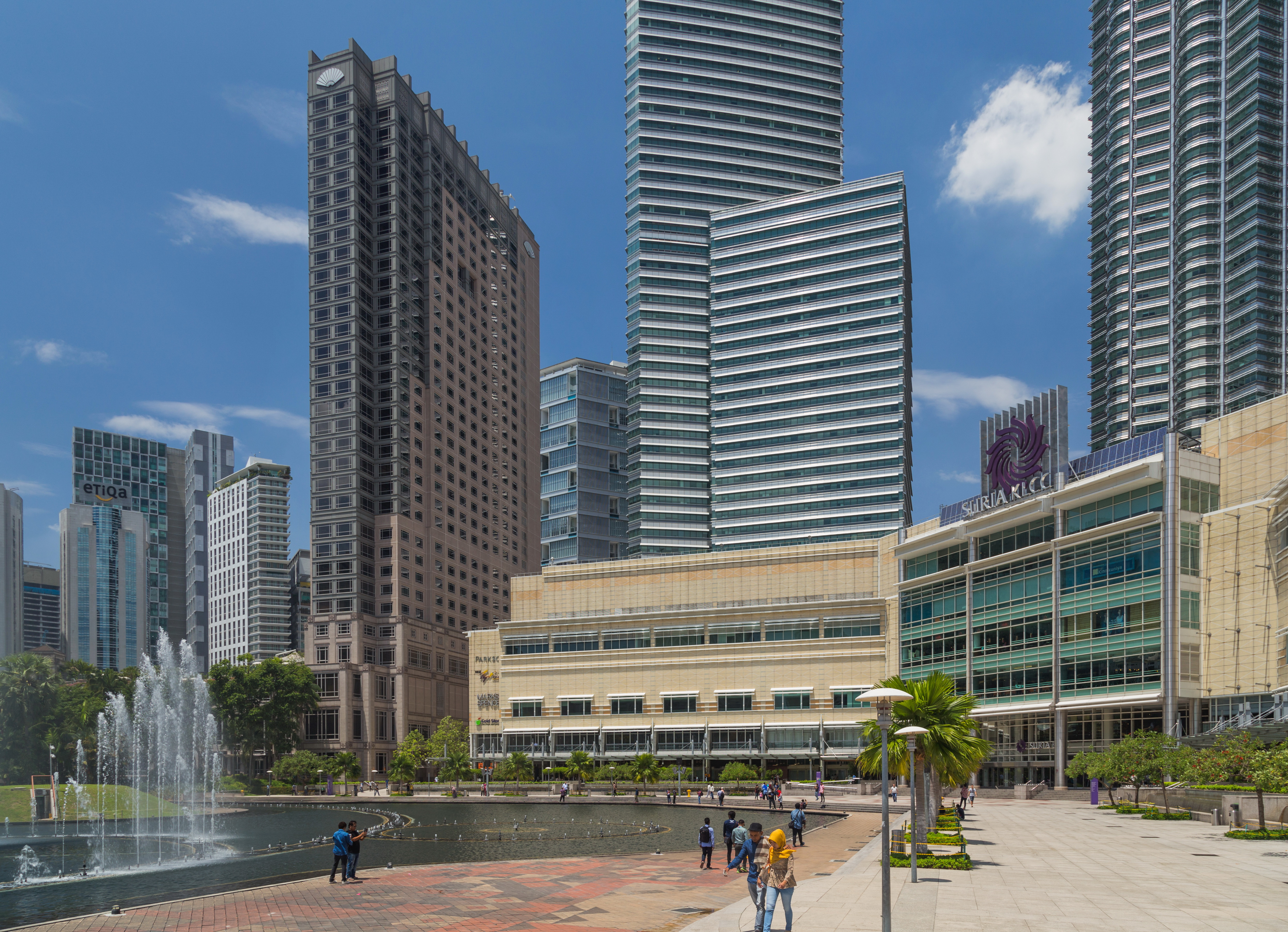
Suria KLCC, located between the Petronas Twin Towers

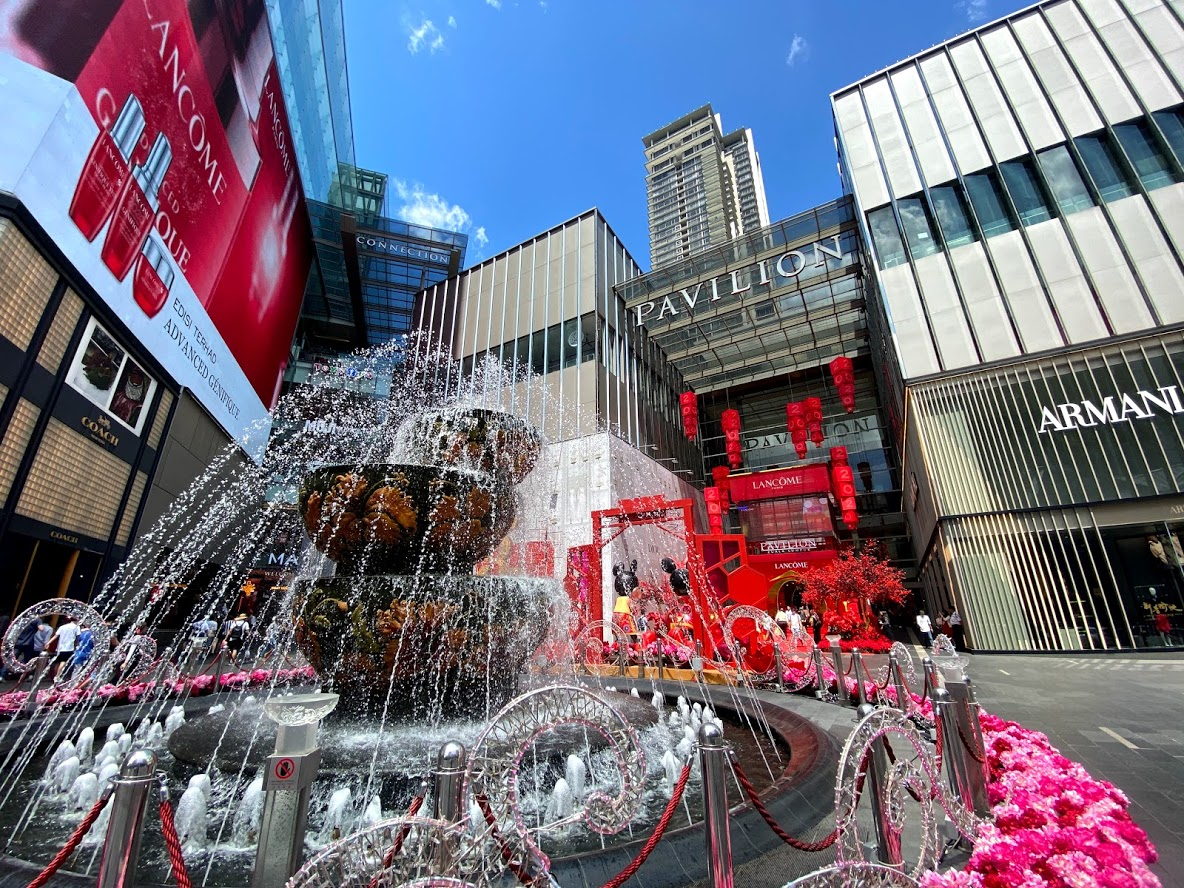
Pavilion KL, one of the city's iconic shopping centres

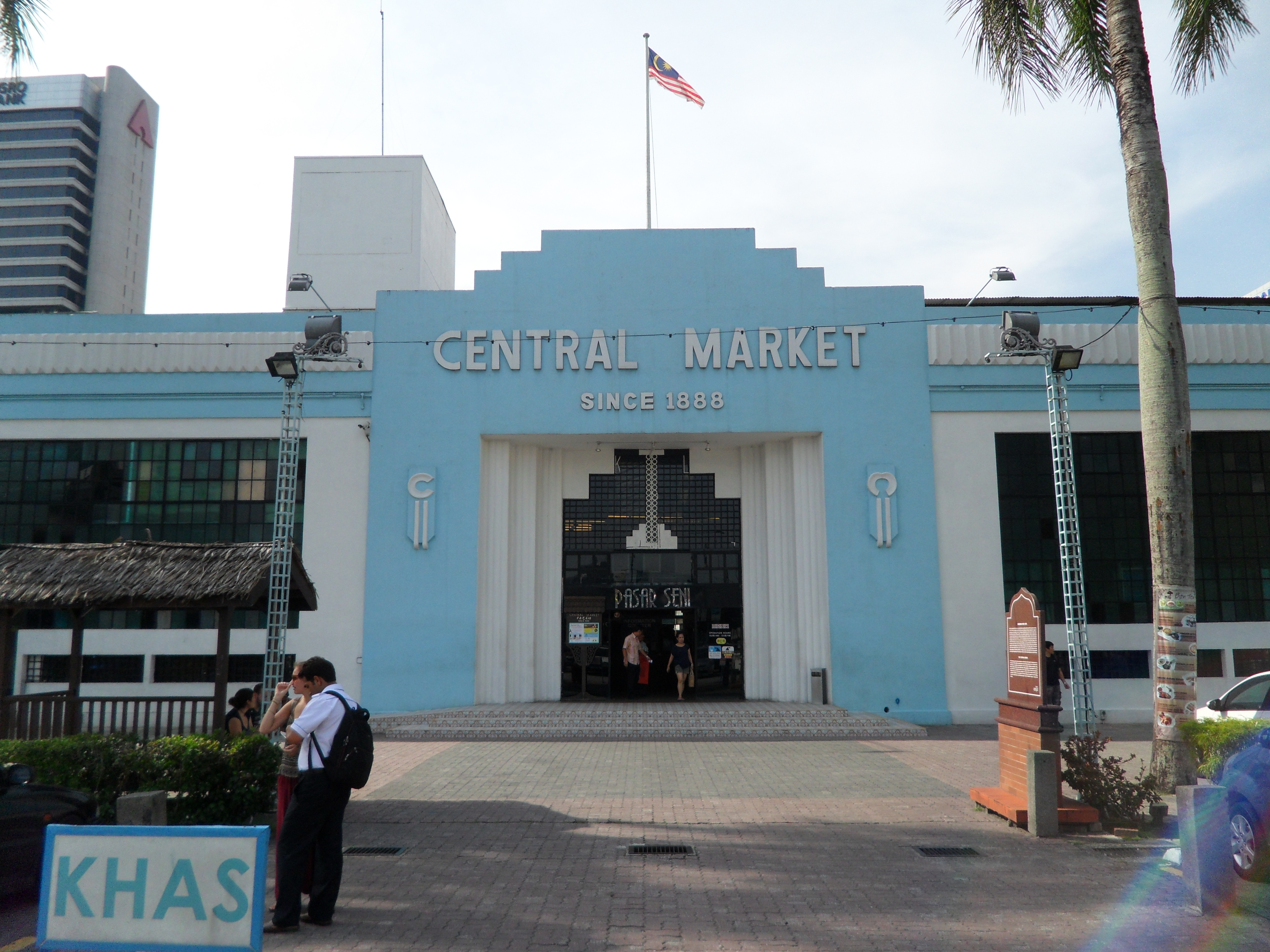
Pasar Seni (Central Market), known for its art and craft souvenirs based on Malaysian culture

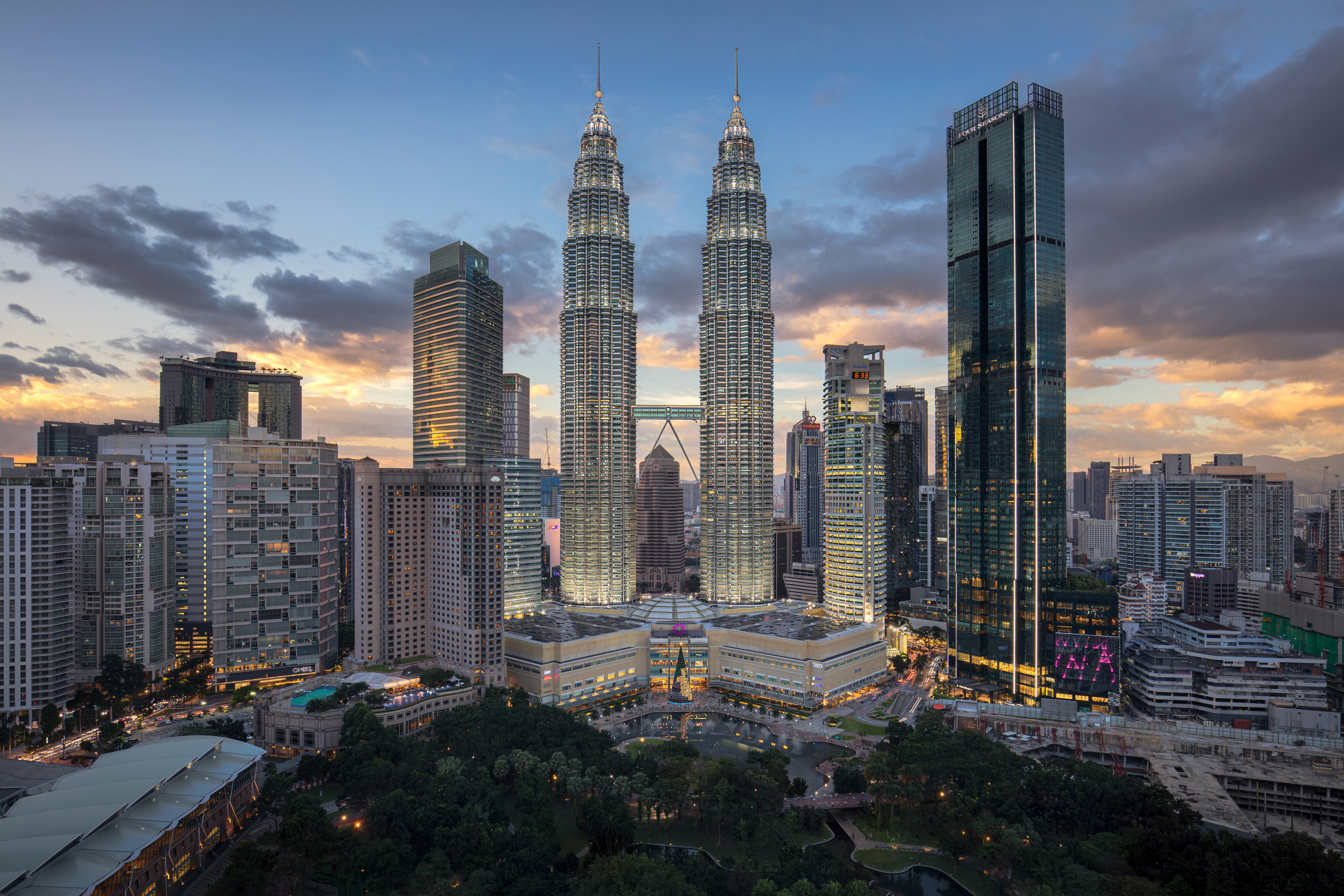
The Carigali Tower, Petronas Twin Towers, Maxis Tower and Four Seasons Place KL from left

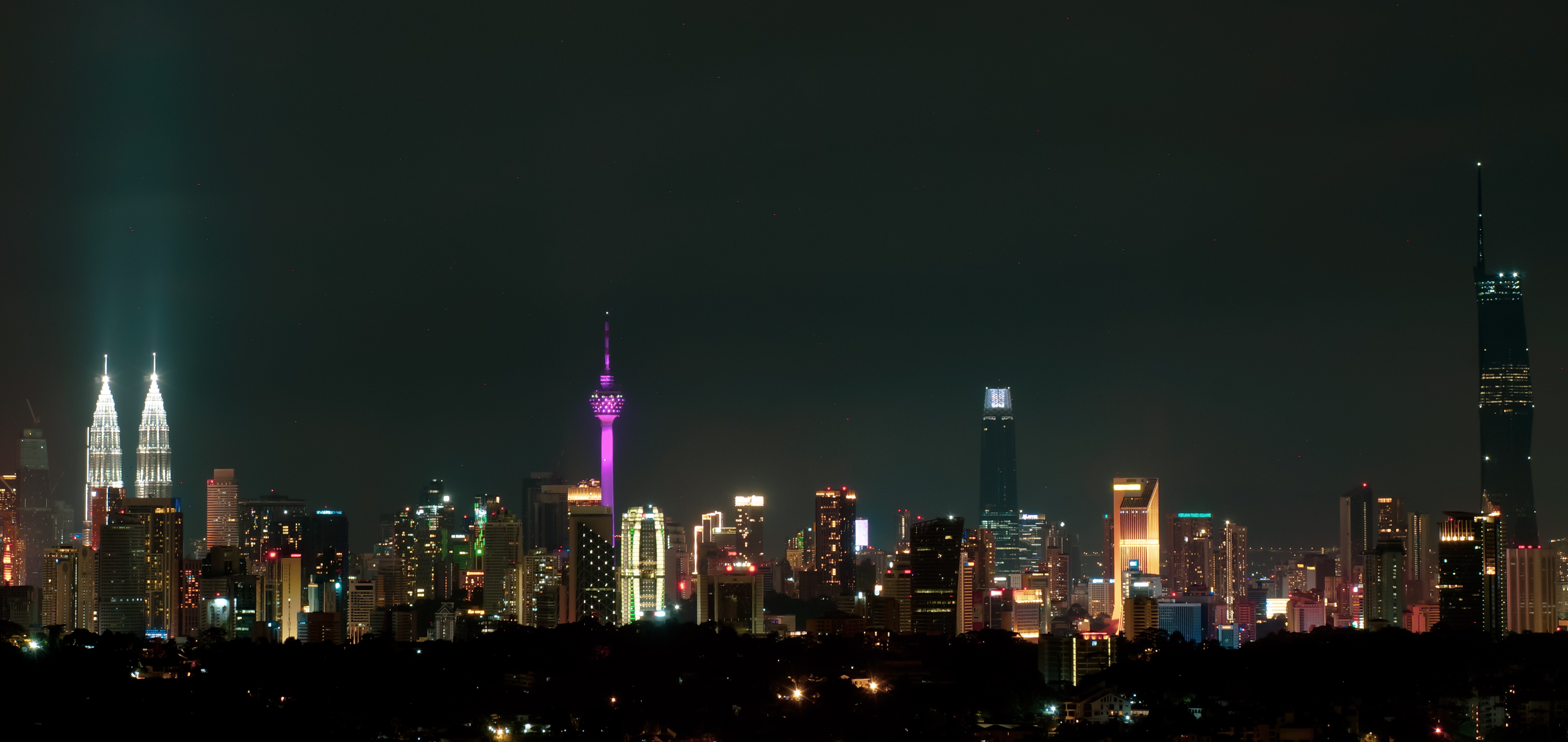
Four of the tallest structures in Kuala Lumpur in a single panorama, April 2024

== Demographics ==
Ethnicities of Kuala Lumpur – 2020 Census
Ethnic group	Percent
Bumiputras	47.7%
Chinese	41.6%
Indians	10.0%
Others	0.7%
Population by percentage excluding non-citizens which form 10.5% of KL's population

Kuala Lumpur is the most populous city in Malaysia, with a population of 2.076 million in the city proper as of 2024. It has a population density of 8,157 inhabitants per square kilometre (21,130/sq mi), and is the most densely populated administrative district in Malaysia. Residents of the city are colloquially known as KLites. Kuala Lumpur is also the centre of the wider Klang Valley metropolitan area covering Petaling Jaya, Klang, Subang Jaya, Puchong, Shah Alam, and Gombak, with an estimated metropolitan population of 7.25 million as of 2017.

Kuala Lumpur's heterogeneous populace includes the country's three major ethnic groups: the Malays, the Chinese, and the Indians, although the city also has a mix of different cultures including Eurasians, Kadazans, Ibans and other Indigenous races from around Malaysia.

=== Historical demographics ===
Historical population
Year	Pop.	±%
1890	20,000	—
1900	30,000	+50.0%
1931	111,418	+271.4%
1957	316,537	+184.1%
1970	451,201	+42.5%
1974	612,004	+35.6%
1980	919,610	+50.3%
1991	1,145,342	+24.5%
2000	1,305,792	+14.0%
2010	1,588,750	+21.7%
2020	1,982,112	+24.8%
Kuala Lumpur expanded as a Federal Territory in 1974; Source:

Historically, Kuala Lumpur was a predominantly Chinese city, although more recently the Bumiputera component of the city has grown substantially and they are now the dominant group. The Kuala Lumpur of 1872 beside the Klang River was described by Frank Swettenham as a "purely Chinese village", although a Malay stockade already existed at Bukit Nanas at that time.

By 1875, after participation in the Selangor Civil War by Pahang Malays had ended, Swettenham noted Malay quarters near the Chinese area in a sketch map he had drawn. There were said to be 1,000 Chinese and 700 Malays in the town in this period. Many of the Malays may have settled in Kuala Lumpur after the war. The population of Kuala Lumpur had increased to around three thousand in 1880 when it was made the capital of Selangor. A significant component of the Malay population in Kuala Lumpur of this period consisted of Malays recruited by the British in 1880, mostly from rural Malacca, to establish a police force of 2–300, many of whom brought their families. Many of the Malays were originally from the other islands of Malay Archipelago i.e., Sumatra and Java. The Mandailings, the Minangkabaus, Javanese, and Buginese began arriving in Kuala Lumpur in the 19th century, while the Acehnese arrived in the late 20th century. In the following decades that saw the rebuilding of the town, it grew considerably with a large influx of immigrants, due in large part to the construction of a railway line in 1886 connecting Kuala Lumpur and Klang.

A census in 1891 of uncertain accuracy gave a figure of 43,796 inhabitants, 79% of whom were Chinese (71% of the Chinese were Hakka, but possibly over-counted), 14% Malay, and 6% Indian. Another perhaps more accurate survey put the population of Kuala Lumpur in 1891 at around 19,000, with 73% Chinese and 12% each for both Malays and Indians. The rubber boom in the early 20th century led to a further increase in population, from 30,000 in 1900 to 80,000 in 1920.

In 1931, 61% of Kuala Lumpur's 111,418 inhabitants were Chinese, and in 1947 63.5%. The Malays however, began to settle in Kuala Lumpur in significant numbers, in part due to government employment, as well as the expansion of the city that absorbed the surrounding rural areas where many Malays lived. Between 1947 and 1957, the population of Malays in Kuala Lumpur increased from 12.5 to 15%, while the proportion of Chinese dropped. The process continued after Malayan independence with the growth of a largely Malay civil service, and later the implementation of the New Economic Policy which encouraged Malay participation in urban industries and business. In 1980 the population of Kuala Lumpur had reached over a million, with 52% Chinese, 33% Malay, and 15% Indian. From 1980 to 2000 the number of Bumiputeras increased by 77%, but the Chinese still outnumbered the Bumiputeras in Kuala Lumpur in the 2000 census at 43% compared to 38%. By the 2010 census, according to the Department of Statistics and excluding non-citizens, the Malay population in Kuala Lumpur had increased to 44.7% (45.9% Bumiputera), exceeding the Chinese population of 43.2%. In the 2020 census, the percentage of the Bumiputera population in Kuala Lumpur had reached around 47.7%, with the Chinese population at 41.6% and Indians 10.0%.

A notable phenomenon in recent times has been the increased portion of foreign residents in Kuala Lumpur, which rose from 1% of the city's population in 1980 to about 8% in the 2000 census, 9.4% in 2010, and 10.5% in the 2020 census. These figures also do not include a significant number of illegal immigrants. Kuala Lumpur's rapid development has triggered a huge influx of low-skilled foreign workers from Indonesia, Nepal, Myanmar, Thailand, Bangladesh, India, Pakistan, Sri Lanka, Philippines, Vietnam, Laos and Cambodia into Malaysia, many of whom enter the country illegally or without proper permits.

Birth rates in Kuala Lumpur have declined and resulted in a lower proportion of young people – the proportion of those below 15 years old fell from 33% in 1980 to slightly less than 27% in 2000. On the other hand, the working age group of 15–59 increased from 63% in 1980 to 67% in 2000. The elderly age group, 60 years old and above has increased from 4% in 1980 and 1991 to 6% in 2000.

=== Ethnic groups in Kuala Lumpur ===
Race Population in Kuala Lumpur, 1980–2026
Year	Malay	Other Bumiputera	Chinese	Indian	Others	Total
1980	320,500 (32.6%)	-	512,000 (52.1%)	140,800 (14.3%)	9,600 (1%)	982,900
1990	499,600 (41%)	-	561,100 (46.1%)	141,100 (11.6%)	16,000 (1.3%)	1,217,800
2000	560,700 (42.6%)	12,000 (0.9%)	576,600 (43.8%)	149,600 (11.4%)	17,600 (1.3%)	1,316,500
2010	685,700 (44.7%)	19,400 (1.3%)	656,900 (42.8%)	157,900 (10.3%)	14,000 (0.9%)	1,533,900
2020	824,600 (46.5%)	21,700 (1.2%)	737,200 (41.6%)	178,100 (10%)	12,100 (0.7%)	1,773,700
2025	862,200 (47.8%)	21,000 (1.2%)	729,600 (40.5%)	176,900 (9.8%)	13,800 (0.8%)	1,803,500

=== Languages and religions ===
Religion in Kuala Lumpur – 2020 Census
Religion	Percent
Islam	45.3%
Buddhism	32.3%
Hinduism	8.2%
Christianity	6.4%
Others	1.8%
No religion	6.0%

Kuala Lumpur is pluralistic and religiously diverse. The city has many places of worship catering to the multi-religious population. Islam is practised primarily by the Malays, the Indian Muslim communities, and a small number of Chinese Muslims. Buddhism, Confucianism and Taoism are practised mainly among the Chinese. Indians traditionally adhere to Hinduism. Some Chinese and Indians also subscribe to Christianity. Kuala Lumpur is one of the three states where less than 50% of the population are self-identified Muslims, the other two being Penang and Sarawak. As of the 2020 Census, the population of Kuala Lumpur was 45.3% Muslim, 32.3% Buddhist, 8.2% Hindu, 6.4% Christian, 1.8% of other religions, and 6.0% non-religious.

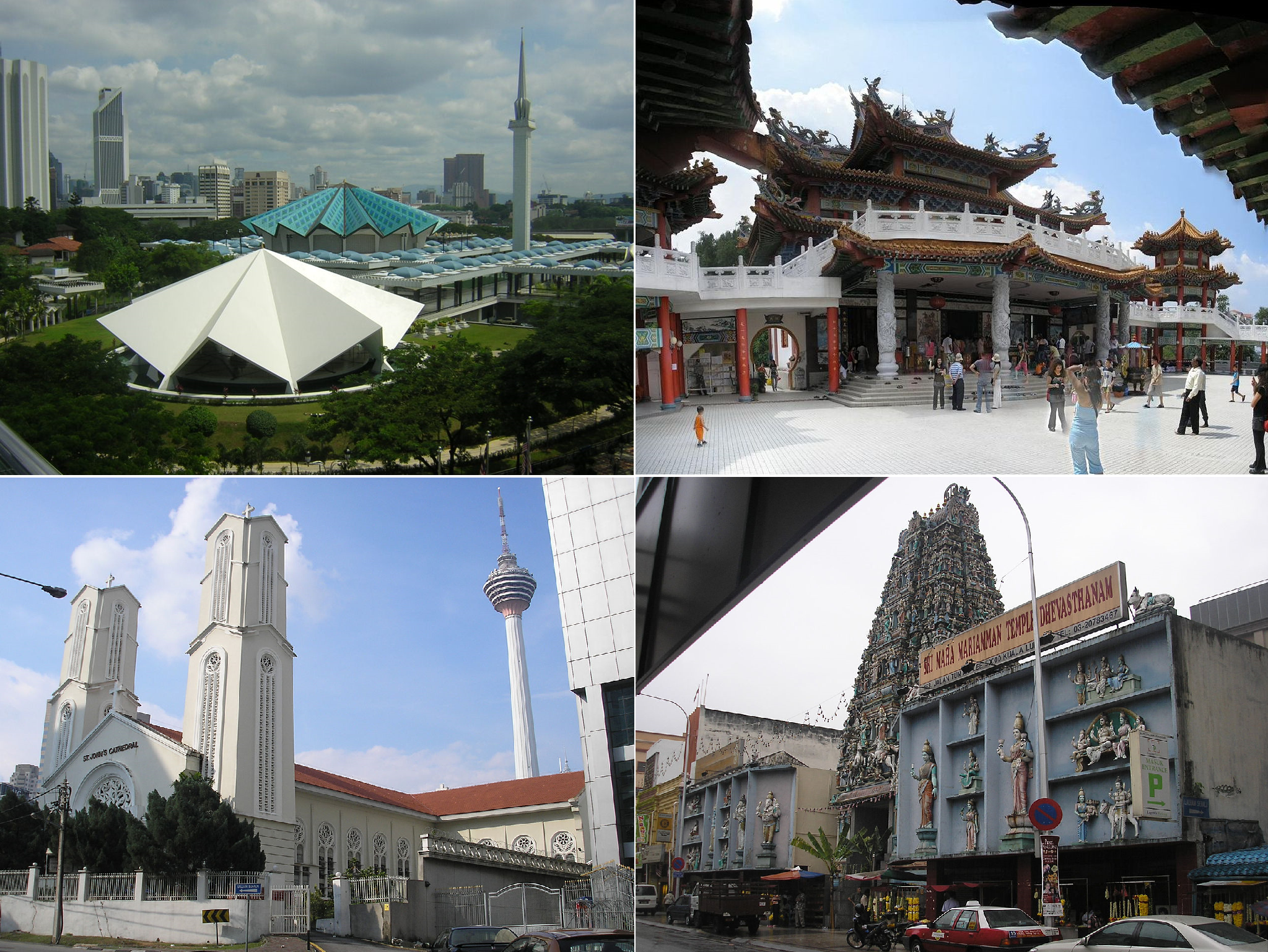
Clockwise from top left: Masjid Negara, Thean Hou Temple, Sri Mahamariamman Temple, St. John's Cathedral

Statistics from the 2010 Census indicate that 87.4% of the Chinese population identify as Buddhists, with significant minorities of adherents identifying as Christians (7.9%), Chinese folk religions (2.7%) and Muslims (0.6%). The majority of the Indian population identifies as Hindus (81.1%), with significant minorities identifying as Christians (7.8%), Muslims (4.9%) and Buddhists (2.1%). The non-Malay bumiputera community is predominantly Christians (44.9%), with significant minorities identifying as Muslims (31.2%) and Buddhists (13.5%). All bumiputera Malays are Muslim due to the criterion in the definition of a Malay in the Malaysian constitution that they should adhere to Islam.

Bahasa Malaysia is the principal language in Kuala Lumpur. Majority of local Malays speak Selangor dialect (read as Johor-Riau dialect) but Malays from other parts of the state such as Kedah, Kelantan and Terengganu, as well as Sarawak and also Brunei Malay that was spoken by those from Sabah/Labuan, are significantly using their respective dialect varieties of Malay.

Kuala Lumpur residents are generally literate in English, with a large proportion adopting it as their first language, especially among younger and certain adult generations. Malaysian English is widely used. It has a strong presence, especially in business, and is taught as a compulsory language in schools.

In addition, the Cantonese dialect group forms the majority among the local Chinese population, Hokkien and Mandarin are prominent, as they are also widely spoken among the Chinese communities. Another major Chinese dialect spoken is Hakka.

While Tamil is dominant among the local Indian population, other Indian languages spoken by minorities include Telugu, Malayalam, Punjabi, and Hindi.

Besides Malay, there are a variety of languages spoken by people of Indonesian descent, such as Minangkabau and Javanese.

There are also various foreign speakers of Arabic, Japanese, Korean, Thai, Spanish etc, as well as diverse indigenous languages of Semai, Iban, Kadazandusun, Bidayuh and other languages.

== Cityscape ==
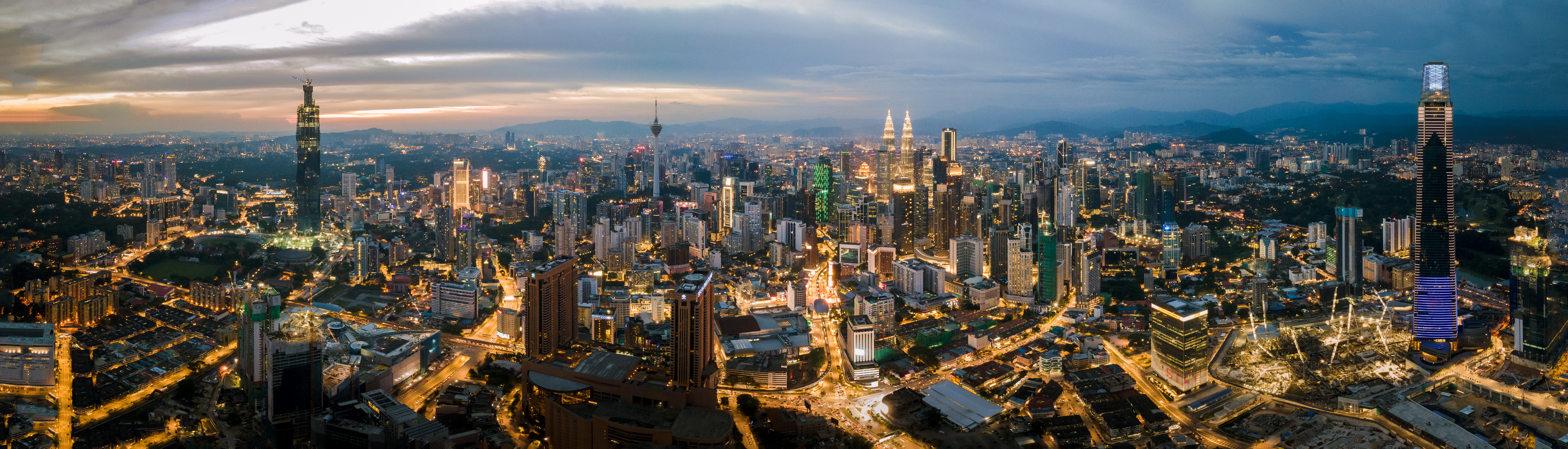
Panorama view of Kuala Lumpur in 2020

=== Architecture ===
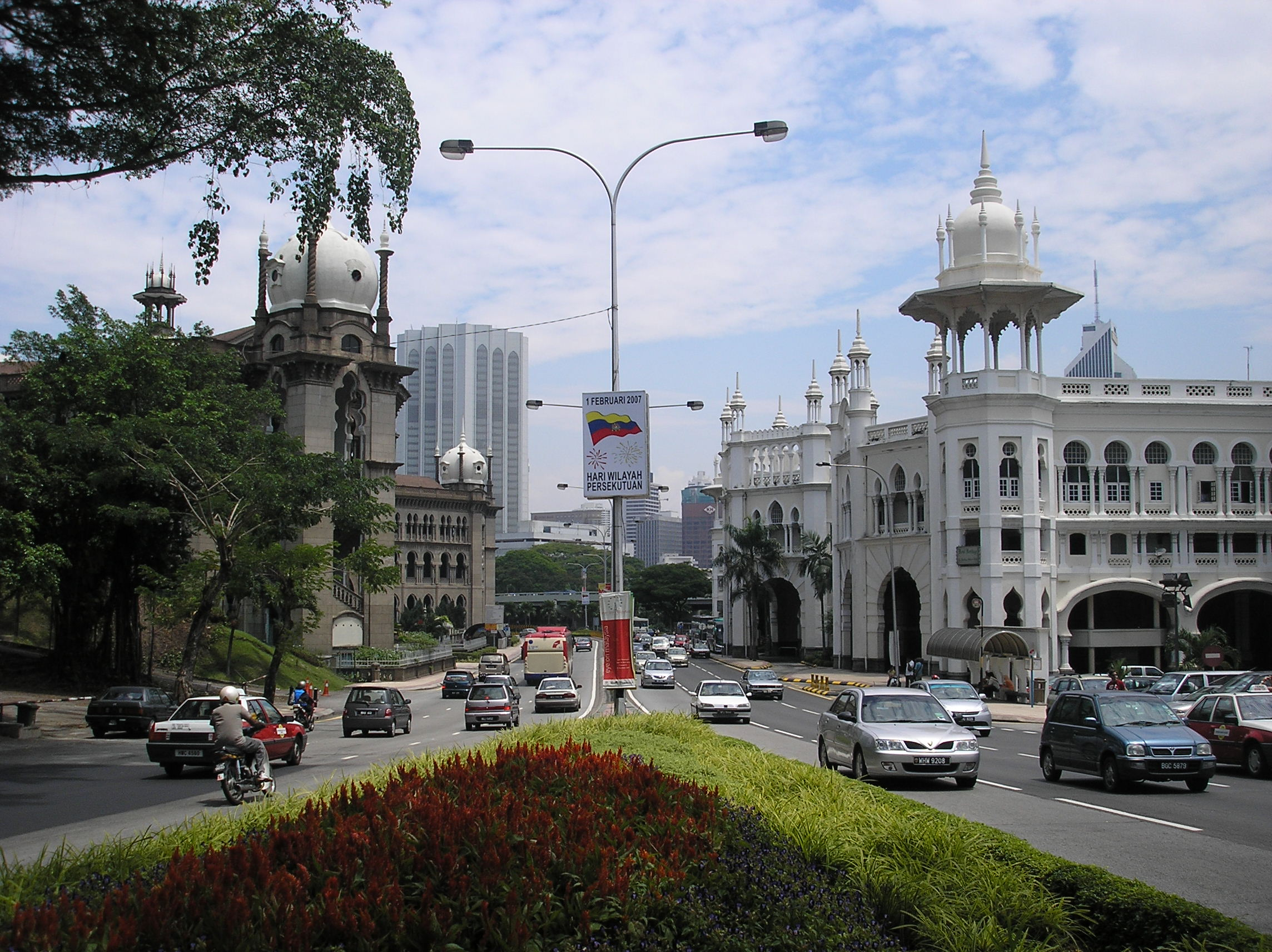
The Kuala Lumpur Railway Station (right) contrasts with Keretapi Tanah Melayu (left) Administration Building, a darker, similarly Mughal-styled building. Both were designed by A. B. Hubback.

The architecture of Kuala Lumpur is a mixture of old colonial influences, Asian traditions, Malay Islamic inspirations, modern, and postmodern architecture. A relatively young city compared with other Southeast Asian capitals such as Bangkok, Jakarta and Manila, most of Kuala Lumpur's notable colonial-era buildings were built toward the end of the 19th and early 20th centuries. These buildings were designed in a number of styles – Mughal/Moorish Revival, Mock Tudor, Neo-Gothic or Grecian-Spanish style or architecture. Most of the styling has been modified to use local resources and adapted to the local climate, which is hot and humid all year round. A significant architect of the early period is Arthur Benison Hubback, who designed a number of the colonial-era buildings, including the Kuala Lumpur Railway Station and Jamek Mosque.

Before World War II, many shophouses, usually two stories with functional shops on the ground floor and separate residential spaces upstairs, were built around the old city centre. These shop-houses drew inspiration from Straits Chinese and European traditions. Some of these shophouses have made way for new developments but there are still many standing today in the Medan Pasar Besar (Old Market Square), Chinatown, Jalan Tuanku Abdul Rahman, Jalan Doraisamy, Bukit Bintang and Tengkat Tong Shin areas.

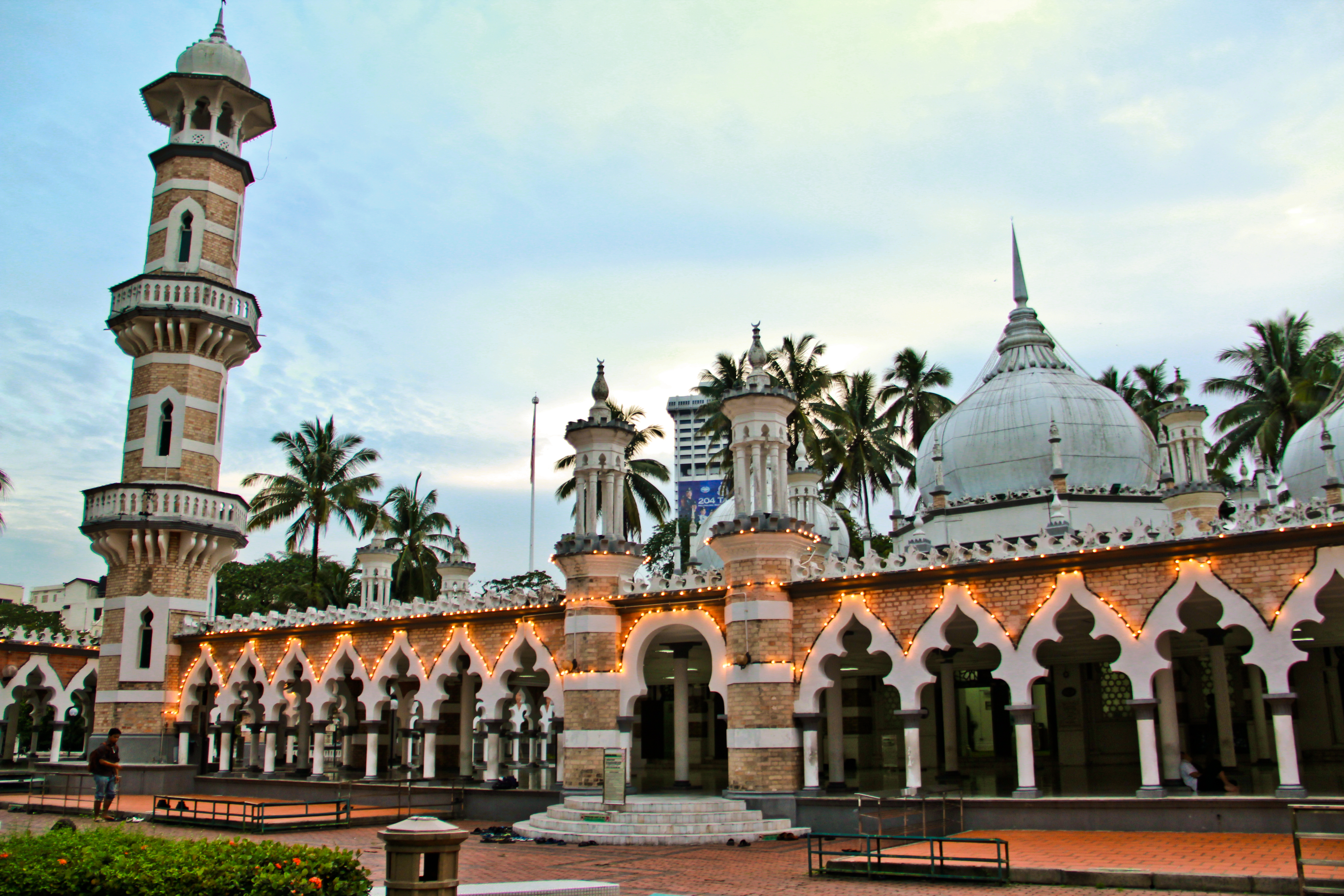
Jamek Mosque (Masjid Jamek) is one of the oldest mosques still standing in Kuala Lumpur, built in 1909.

Independence coupled with rapid economic growth from the 1970s to the 1990s and with Islam being the official religion in the country, has resulted in the construction of buildings with a more local and Islamic flavour around the city. Many of these buildings derive their design from traditional Malay items such as the songkok and the keris. Some of these buildings have Islamic geometric motifs integrated into the designs of the building, due to Islamic restrictions on imitating nature through drawings. Examples of these buildings are Telekom Tower, Maybank Tower, Dayabumi Complex, and the Islamic Centre. Some buildings such as the Islamic Arts Museum Malaysia and National Planetarium have been built to masquerade as a place of worship, complete with dome and minaret, when in fact they are places of science and knowledge. The 452-metre (1,483 ft) Petronas Towers are the tallest twin buildings in the world and were the tallest buildings in the country until being surpassed by The Exchange 106 by 1.7 meters in 2019. They were designed to resemble motifs found in Islamic art.

Late modern and postmodern architecture began to appear in the late-1990s and early-2000s. With economic development, old buildings such as Bok House have been razed to make way for new ones. Buildings with all-glass shells exist throughout the city, with the most prominent examples being the Petronas Towers and Kuala Lumpur Convention Centre. Kuala Lumpur's central business district today has shifted to the Kuala Lumpur city centre (KLCC), where many new and tall buildings with modern and postmodern architecture fill the skyline. According to the World Tallest 50 Urban Agglomeration 2010 Projection by the Council on Tall Buildings and Urban Habitat, Kuala Lumpur ranks 10th among cities that have the most buildings above 100 metres with a combined height of 34,035 metres from its 244 high-rise buildings.

=== Parks ===
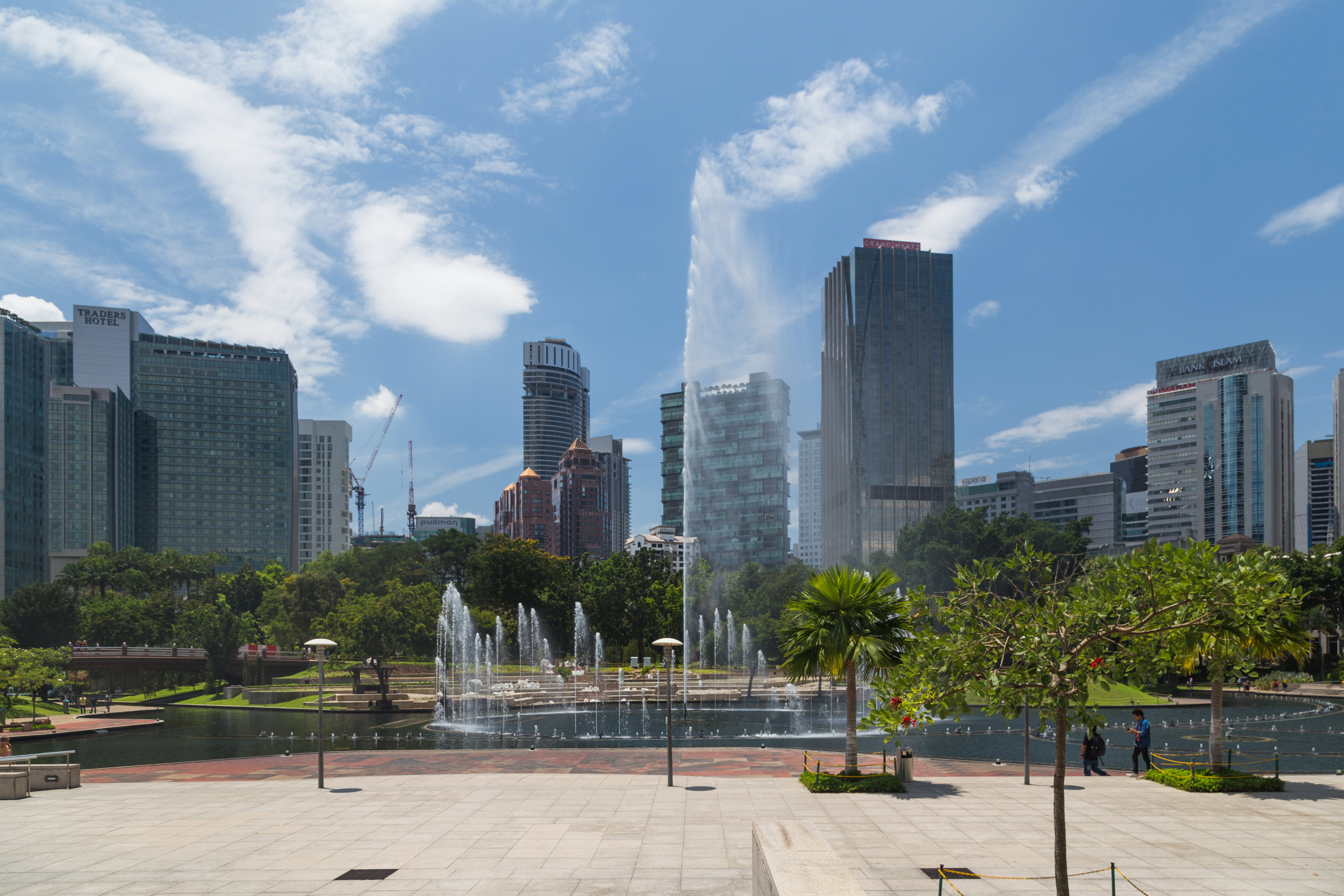
KLCC Park is a 50-acre urban park located in the city centre.

The Perdana Botanical Garden or Lake Gardens, a 92-hectare (230-acre) botanical garden, was the first recreational park created in Kuala Lumpur. The Malaysian Parliament building is located close by, and Carcosa Seri Negara, which was once the official residence of the British colonial administration, is also sited here. The park includes a butterfly park, deer park, orchid garden, a hibiscus garden, and the Kuala Lumpur Bird Park, which is the world's largest aviary bird park. Other parks in the city include the ASEAN Sculpture Garden, KLCC Park, Titiwangsa Lake Gardens, Metropolitan Lake Gardens in Kepong, Taman Tasik Permaisuri (Queen's Lake Gardens), Bukit Kiara Botanical Gardens, the equestrian park and West Valley Park near Taman Tun Dr Ismail (TTDI), and Bukit Jalil International Park.

There are three forest reserves within the city, the Bukit Nanas Forest Reserve in the city centre, the oldest gazetted forest reserve in the country 10.52 ha or 26.0 acres, Bukit Sungai Putih Forest Reserve (7.41 ha or 18.3 acres) and Bukit Sungai Besi Forest Reserve (42.11 ha or 104.1 acres). Bukit Nanas, in the heart of the city centre, is one of the oldest virgin forests in the world within a city. These residual forest areas are home to a number of fauna species, particularly monkeys, treeshrews, pygmy goats, budgerigars, squirrels and birds.

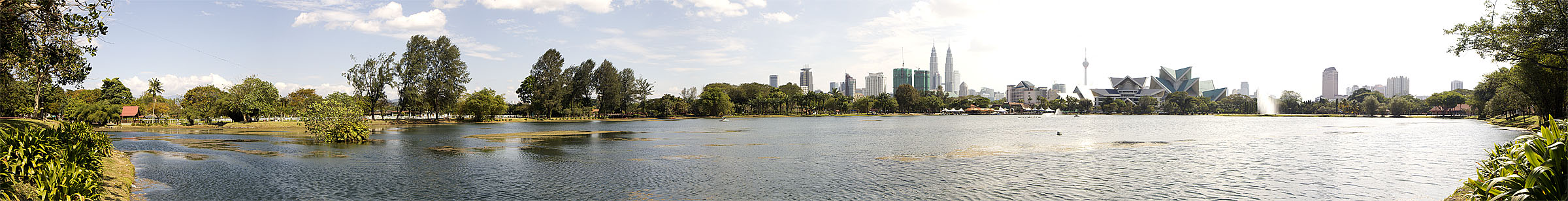
The view of Kuala Lumpur from Titiwangsa Lake Gardens

== Education ==
According to government statistics, Kuala Lumpur had a literacy rate of 97.5% in 2000, the highest rate in any state or territory in Malaysia. In Malaysia, Malay is the language of instruction for most subjects while English is a compulsory subject, but as of 2012, English was still the language of instruction for mathematics and the natural sciences for certain schools. Some schools provide instruction in Mandarin and Tamil for certain subjects.

Kuala Lumpur contains 14 tertiary education institutions, 79 high schools, 155 elementary schools, and 136 kindergartens.

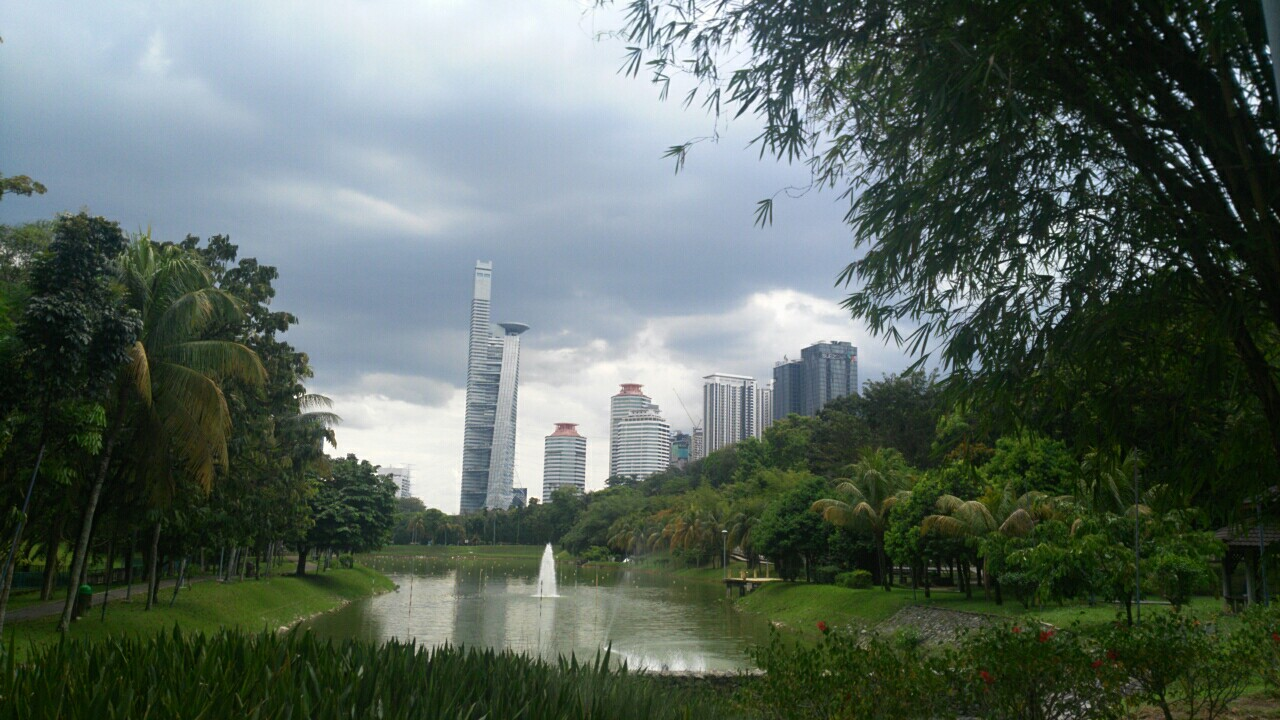
University of Malaya city view

Kuala Lumpur is home to the University of Malaya (UM). Established in 1949, it is the oldest university in Malaysia, and one of the oldest in the region. It was ranked the best university in Malaysia, the 22nd-best in Asia, and third in Southeast Asia in QS World University Rankings 2019. In recent years, the number of international students at the University of Malaya has risen, as a result of increasing efforts made to attract them.

Other universities located in Kuala Lumpur include University of Malaya-Wales (UM-Wales), International Islamic University Malaysia (IIUM), Tunku Abdul Rahman University College (TARUC), UCSI University (UCSI), Taylor's University (TULC), International Medical University (IMU), Open University Malaysia (OUM), Kuala Lumpur University (UniKL), Perdana University (PU), Wawasan Open University (WOU), HELP University and the branch campus of the National University of Malaysia (UKM) and University of Technology Malaysia (UTM). The National Defence University of Malaysia is located at Sungai Besi Army Base, in the southern part of central Kuala Lumpur. It was established to be a major centre for military and defence technology studies. This institution covers studies for the army, navy, and air force.

Greater Kuala Lumpur covers an even more extensive selection of universities including several international branches such as Monash University Malaysia Campus, University of Nottingham Malaysia Campus and Xiamen University Malaysia.

== Culture ==
=== Arts ===
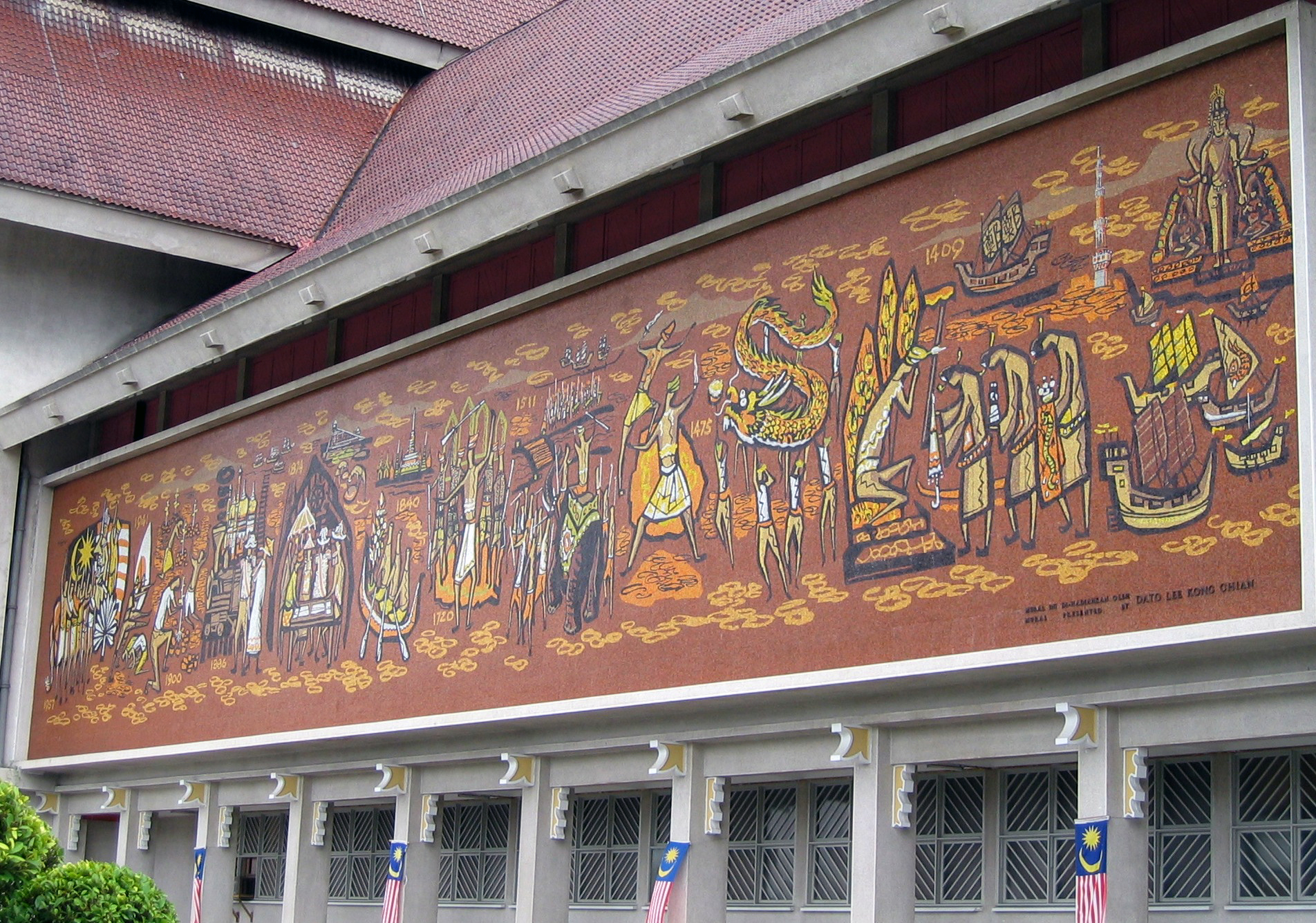
Frieze depicting Malaysian history at the National Museum

Kuala Lumpur is a hub for cultural activities and events in Malaysia. Among the centres is the National Museum, which is situated along the Mahameru Highway. Its collection comprises artefacts and paintings collected throughout the country. The Islamic Arts Museum, which houses more than seven thousand Islamic artefacts including rare exhibits and a library of Islamic art books, is the largest Islamic art collection in Southeast Asia. The museum's collection not only concentrates on works from the Middle East but also includes works from elsewhere in Asia, such as China and Southeast Asia. Kuala Lumpur has a craft complex coupled with a museum that displays a variety of textiles, ceramics, metal craft, and woven products. Information on the production process is portrayed in diorama format, complete with historical facts, techniques, and traditionally engineered equipment. Among the processes shown are pottery making, intricate wood carving, silver-smithing, weaving songket cloth, stamping batik patterns on cloth, and boat-making.

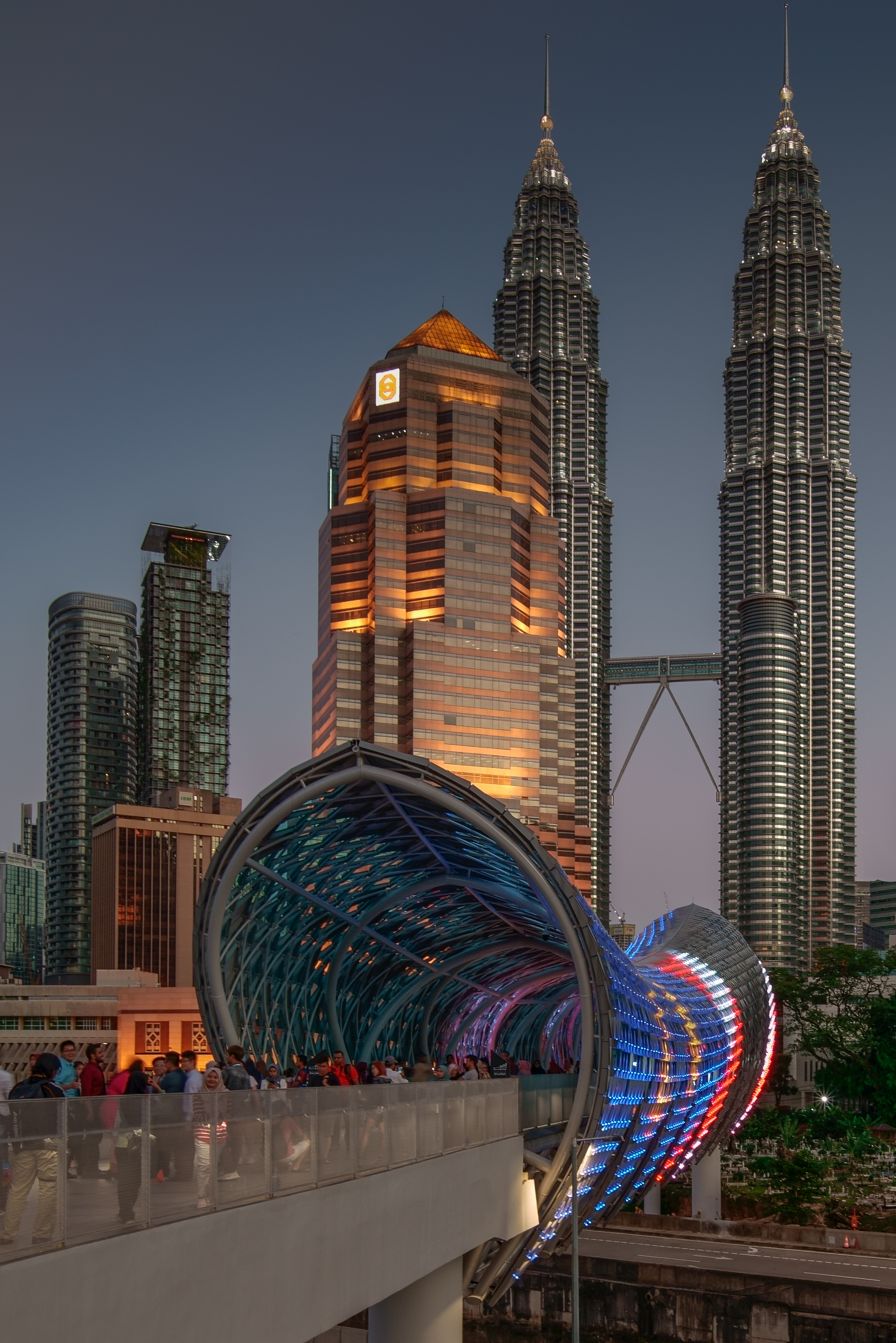
The Saloma Link seen at dusk, with the Petronas Tower behind it

The premier performing arts venue is the Petronas Philharmonic Hall located underneath the Petronas Towers. The resident orchestra is the Malaysian Philharmonic Orchestra (MPO), consisting of musicians from all over the world, and features regular concerts, chamber concerts, and traditional cultural performances. The Kuala Lumpur Performing Arts Centre (KLPac) in Sentul West and Damansara Performing Arts Centre (DPac) in Damansara Perdana are two of the most established centres in the country for the performing arts, notably theatre, plays, music, and film screening. It has housed many local productions and has been a supporter of local and regional independent performance artists. The Future Music Festival Asia has been held in the city since 2012, featuring local and international artists.

The National Art Gallery of Malaysia is located on Jalan Temerloh, off Jalan Tun Razak on a 5.67-hectare (14.0-acre) site neighbouring the National Theatre (Istana Budaya) and National Library. The architecture of the gallery incorporates elements of traditional Malay architecture, as well as contemporary modern architecture. The National Art Gallery serves as a centre of excellence and is a trustee of the national art heritage. The Ilham Tower Gallery near Ampang Park houses exhibitions of works by local and foreign artists.

Kuala Lumpur holds the Malaysia International Gourmet Festival annually. Another event hosted annually by the city is the Kuala Lumpur Fashion Week, which includes international brands and local designers. Also, Kuala Lumpur was designated as the World Book Capital for 2020 by UNESCO.

=== Sports and recreation ===
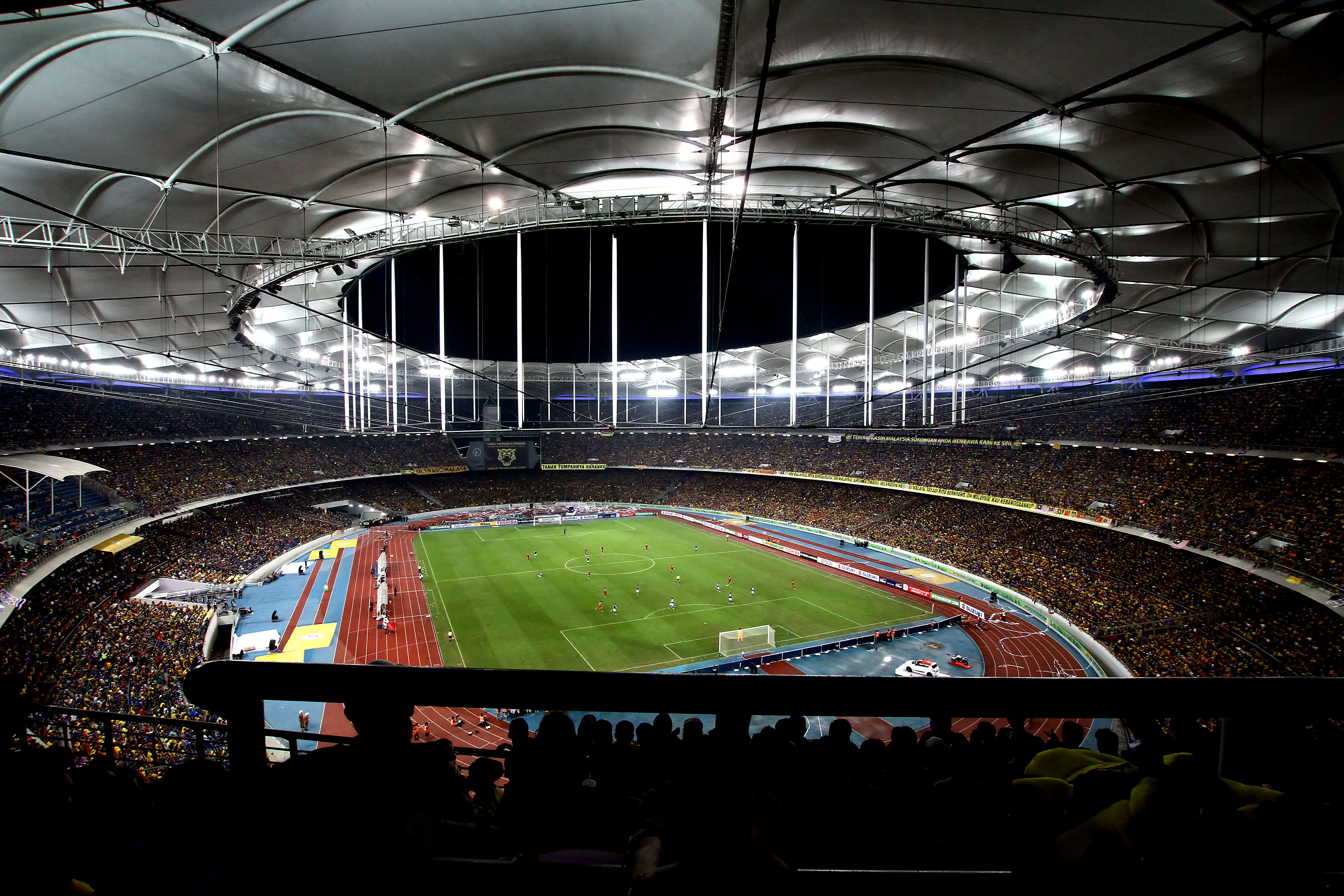
Bukit Jalil National Stadium is an all-seater multi-purpose stadium that was built in January 1995.

Kuala Lumpur has numerous parks, gardens and open spaces for recreational purposes. Total open space for recreational and sports facilities land use in the city has increased significantly by 169.6 per cent from 5.86 square kilometres (1,450 acres) in 1984 to 15.8 square kilometres (3,900 acres) in 2000.

Kuala Lumpur was touted as one of the host cities for the Formula One World Championship from 1999 to 2017. The open-wheel auto racing A1 Grand Prix was held until the series folded in 2009. The Motorcycle Grand Prix races are held at the Sepang International Circuit in Sepang in the neighbouring state of Selangor. The Formula One event contributed significantly to tourist arrivals and tourism income to Kuala Lumpur. This was evident during the Asian financial crisis in 1998. Despite cities around Asia suffering declining tourist arrivals, in Kuala Lumpur tourist arrivals increased from 6,210,900 in 1997 to 10,221,600 in 2000, or 64.6%. In 2015, the Kuala Lumpur Street Circuit was constructed to host the Kuala Lumpur City Grand Prix motor racing event.

Football is one of the most popular sports in Kuala Lumpur. The Merdeka Tournament is mainly held at Stadium Merdeka. The Stadium Negara is also located right next to it which is also one of the oldest indoor stadiums in the country. The city is also the home of Kuala Lumpur City, which plays in the Malaysia Super League. Kuala Lumpur hosted the official Asian Basketball Championship in 1965, 1977 and 1985. The city's basketball supporters cheered Malaysia's national basketball team to a Final Four finish in 1985, the team's best performance to date. Further, the city is home to the Kuala Lumpur Dragons, 2016 Champions of the ASEAN Basketball League. The team plays its home games in the MABA Stadium.

KL Grand Prix CSI 5*, a five-star international showjumping equestrian event, is held annually in the city. Other annual sport events hosted by the city include the KL Tower Run, the KL Tower International BASE Jump Merdeka Circuit and the Kuala Lumpur International Marathon. Kuala Lumpur is also one of the stages of the Tour de Langkawi cycling race. The annual Malaysia Open Super Series badminton tournament is held in Kuala Lumpur.

Kuala Lumpur is also the birthplace of Hashing, which began in December 1938 when a group of British colonial officers and expatriates, some from the Selangor Club, began meeting on Monday evenings to run, in a fashion patterned after the traditional British Paper Chase or "Hare and Hounds".

Kuala Lumpur was the host city of the 1998 Commonwealth Games.

Kuala Lumpur hosted the 128th IOC Session in 2015 where the IOC elected Beijing as the host city of the 2022 Winter Olympics and Lausanne as the host city of the 2020 Winter Youth Olympics.

== Transportation ==
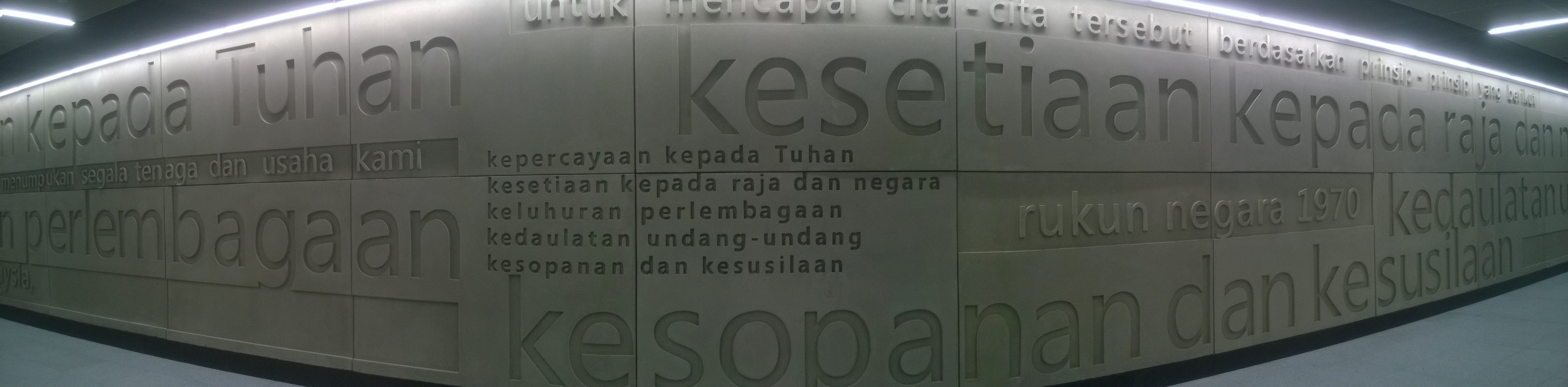
The decorative relief wall portraying the Rukun Negara, the Malaysian national pledge, at the Upper Concourse Level of Merdeka MRT station.

Road traffic of Jalan Kuching, Kuala Lumpur during noon

As in most other Asian cities, driving is the main commuting choice in Kuala Lumpur. Every part of the city is well connected with highways. Kuala Lumpur has a comprehensive road network with more transportation development planned. Public transportation covers a variety of transport modes such as bus, rail and taxi. Despite efforts to promote public transport, utilisation rates are low, 16 per cent of the population in 2006. However, public transport utilisation has increased in recent years with the expansion of the rail network. Majority of the urban public transport modes in Kuala Lumpur and the Klang Valley are operated by Prasarana Malaysia via its subsidiaries Rapid Rail and Rapid Bus, using the Rapid KL brand name. Since the take over from Intrakota Komposit Sdn Bhd, Prasarana Malaysia has redrawn the entire bus network of Kuala Lumpur and the Klang Valley metropolitan area to increase passenger numbers and improve Kuala Lumpur's public transport system. Prasarana Malaysia has adopted the hub and spoke system to provide greater connectivity, and reduce the need for more buses. KL Sentral was added on 16 April 2001 and served as the new transport hub of the Klang Valley Integrated Transit System.

=== Urban rail ===
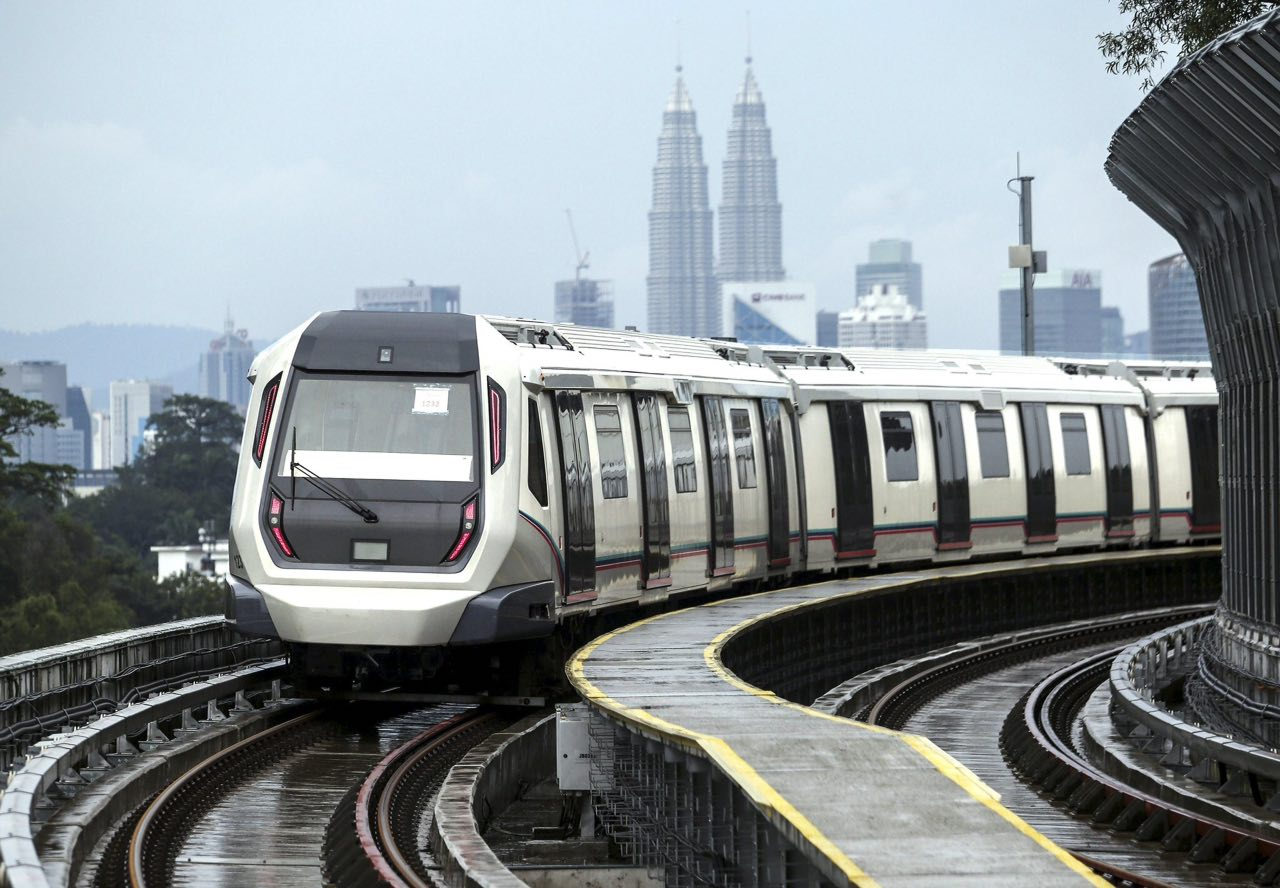
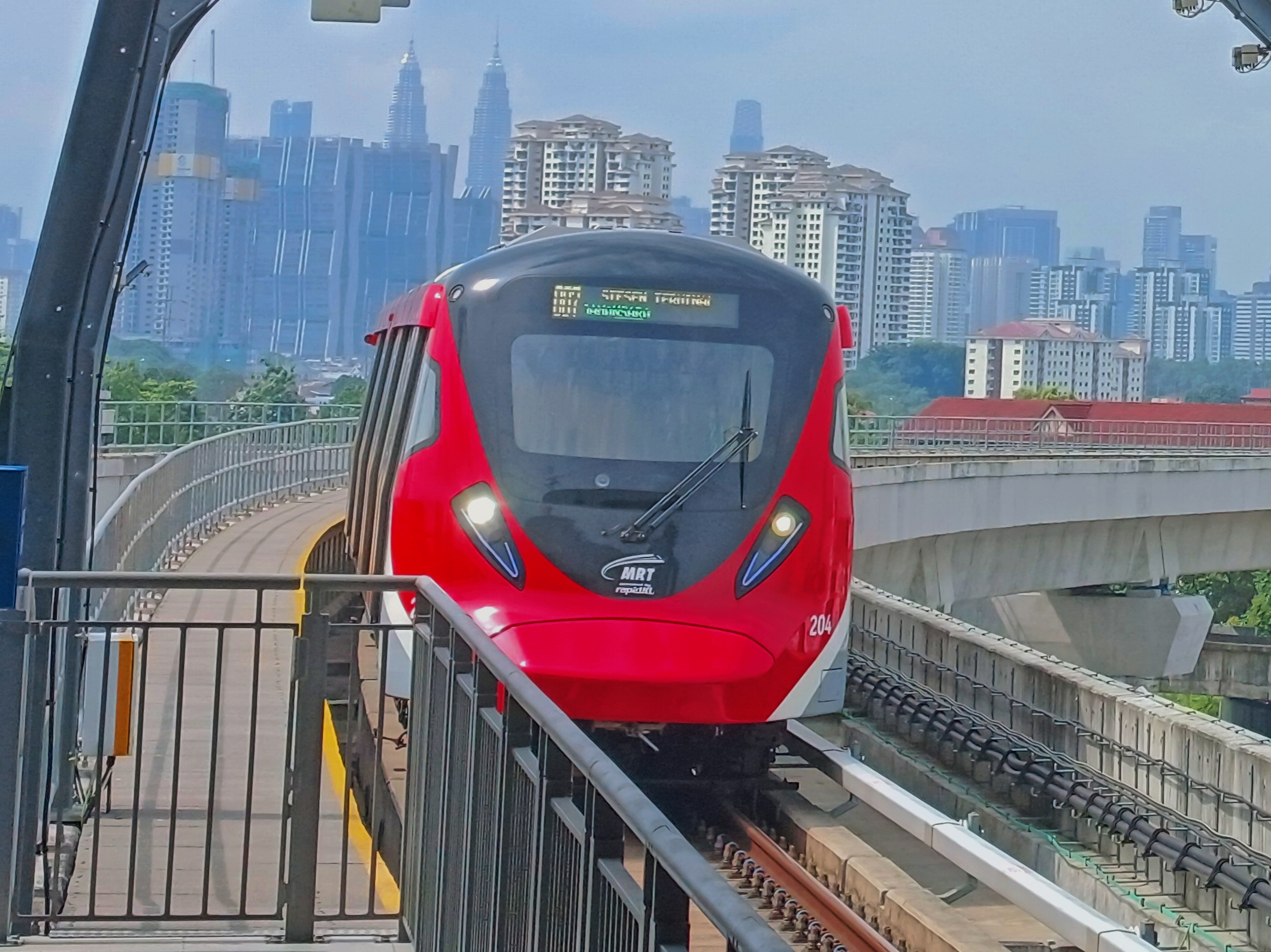
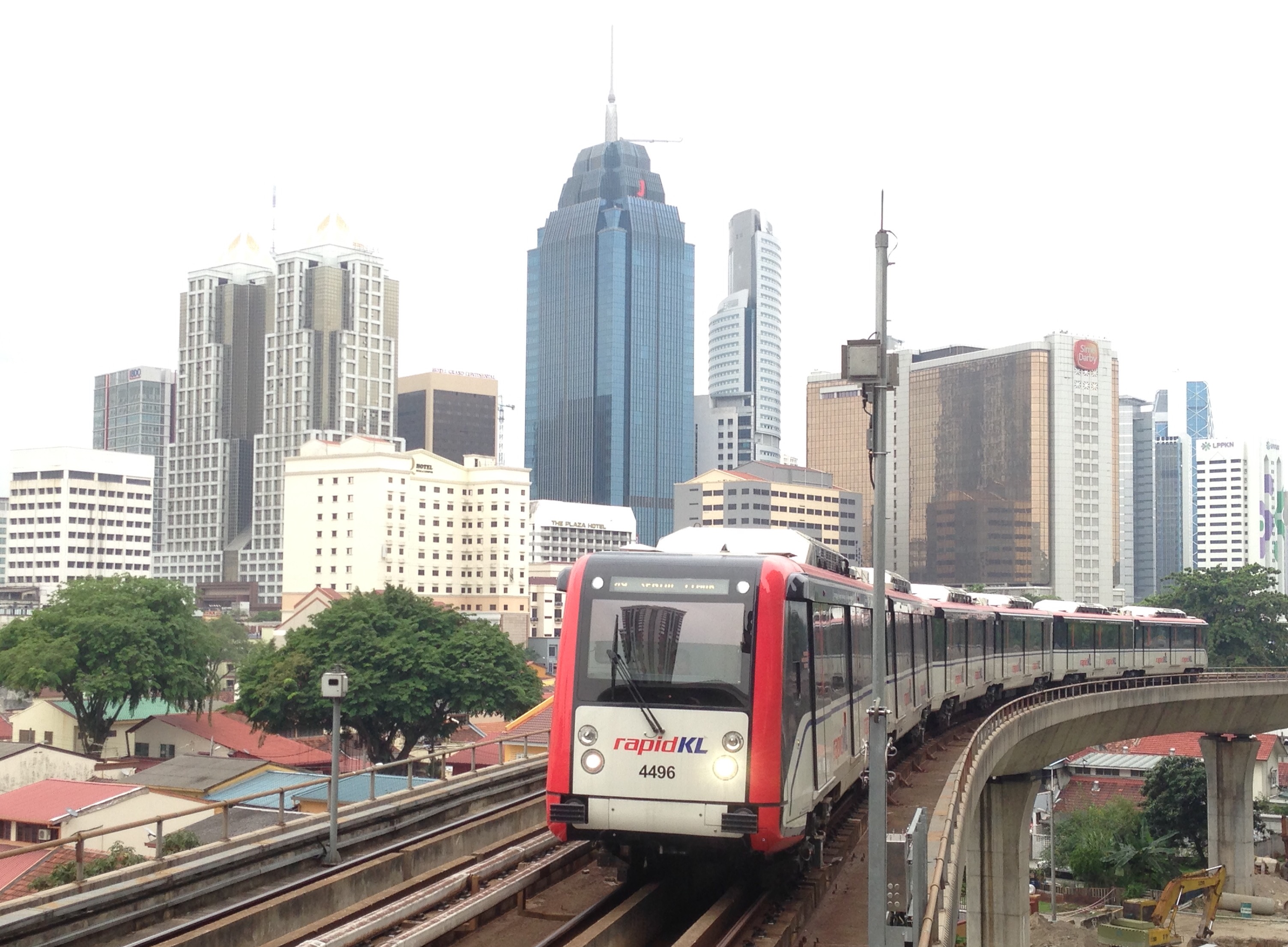
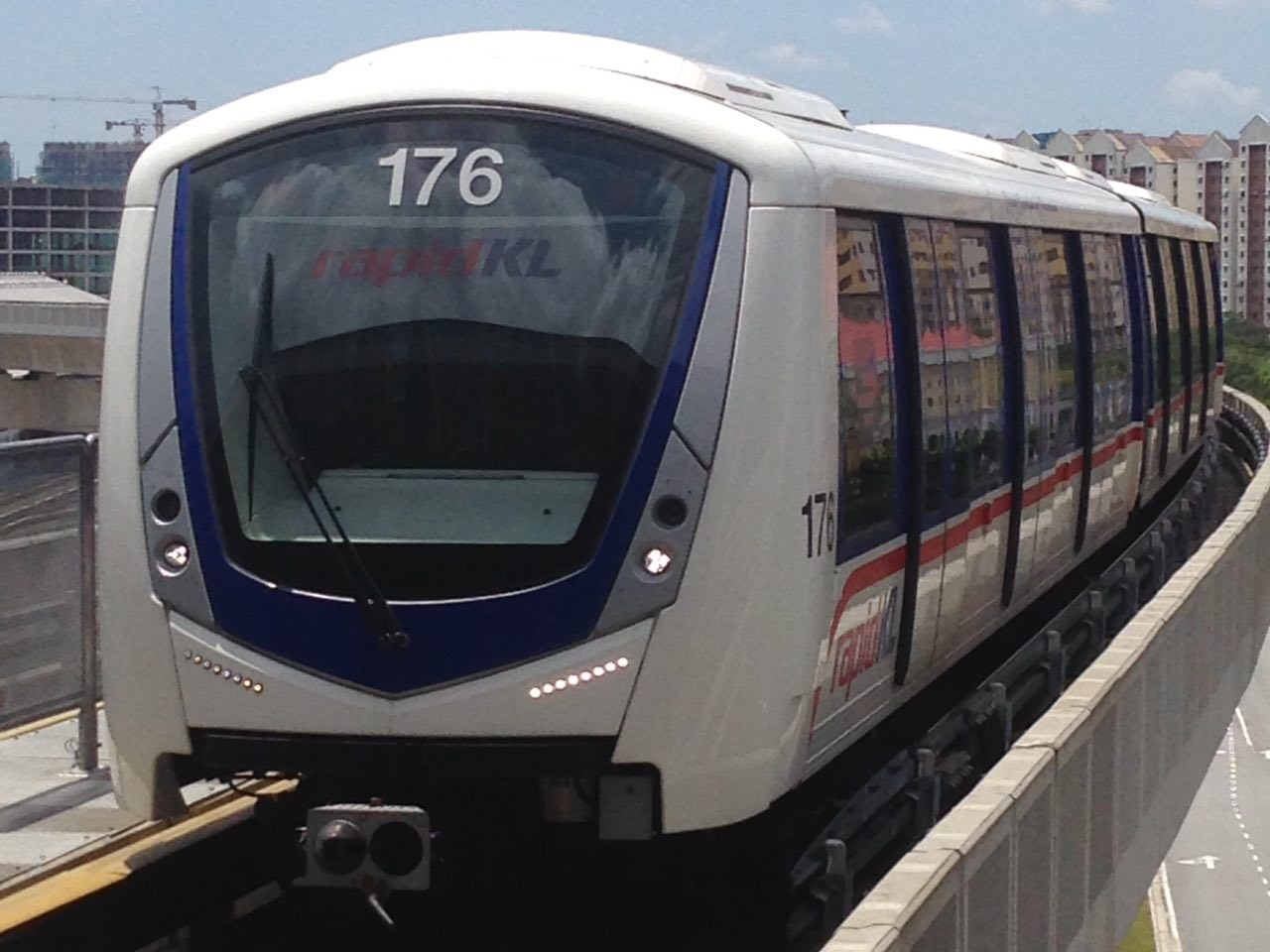
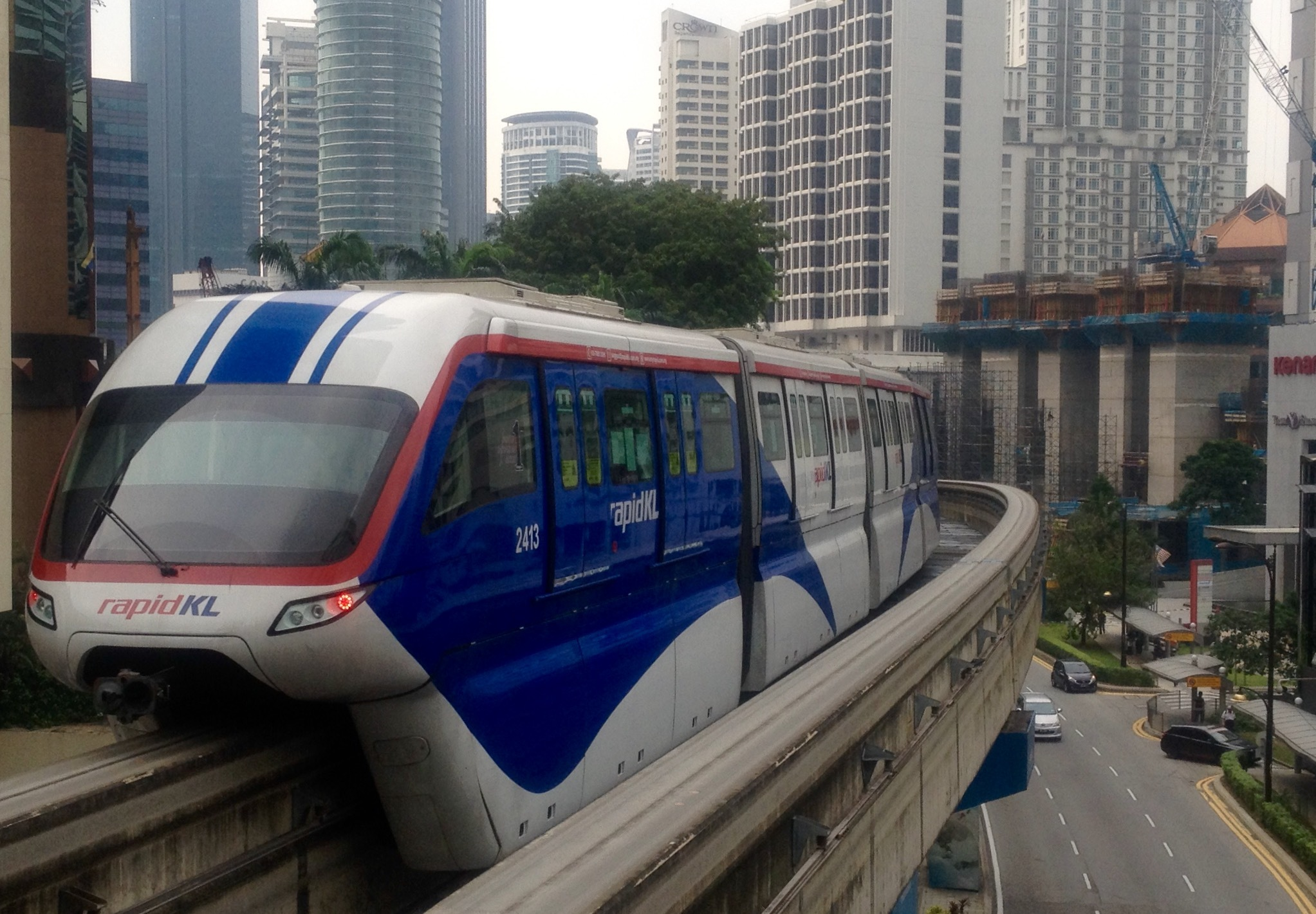
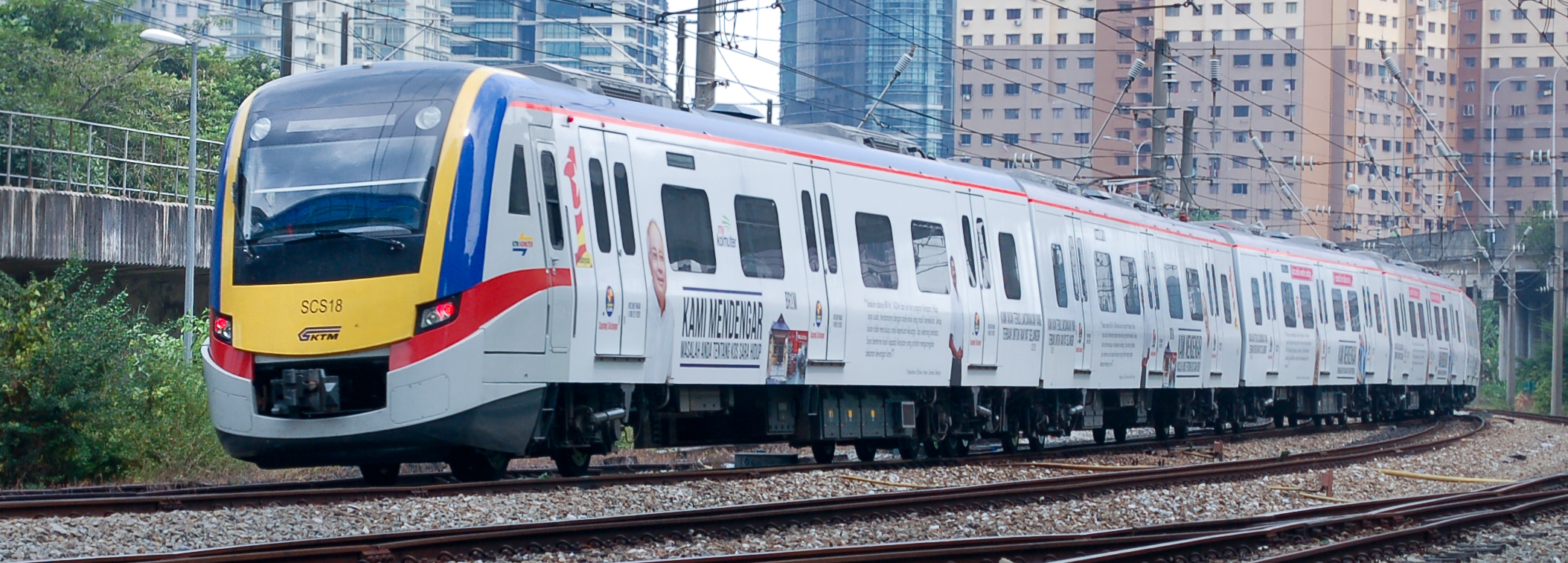
Major urban rail transportation in Kuala Lumpur. Left from top: MRT Kajang Line, MRT Putrajaya Line, LRT Ampang and Sri Petaling Lines, LRT Kelana Jaya Line, KL Monorail and KTM Komuter

The KTM Komuter, a commuter rail service owned and operated by Keretapi Tanah Melayu (KTM), was introduced in 1995 as the first rail transit system to provide local rail services in Kuala Lumpur and the surrounding Klang Valley suburban areas. Services were later expanded to other parts of Malaysia with the introduction of the Northern and Southern sectors. KTM Komuter's 175 km (109 mi) network in the Central Sector has 58 stations. It consists of two cross-city routes, namely the Batu Caves–Pulau Sebang Line and Tanjung Malim–Port Klang Line. Transfers between the two main lines can be made at any of the four stations in the central core: KL Sentral, Kuala Lumpur, Bank Negara and Putra.

The first metro lines in the form of a light rapid transit (LRT) line was opened in 1996 and has since expanded to three lines which opened in 1998 and 1999. They are the LRT Ampang Line, LRT Sri Petaling Line and LRT Kelana Jaya Line. A fourth line, the LRT Shah Alam Line, is currently under construction and is scheduled to launch in 2026. The LRT lines, which functionally are medium-capacity rail systems, were constructed and are owned by Prasarana Malaysia, with operating concessions currently carried by its subsidiary Rapid Rail. In 2006, the government announced extensions for the LRT Sri Petaling Line and the LRT Kelana Jaya Line, as well as upgrading of all the existing to communications-based train control (CBTC) signalling systems.

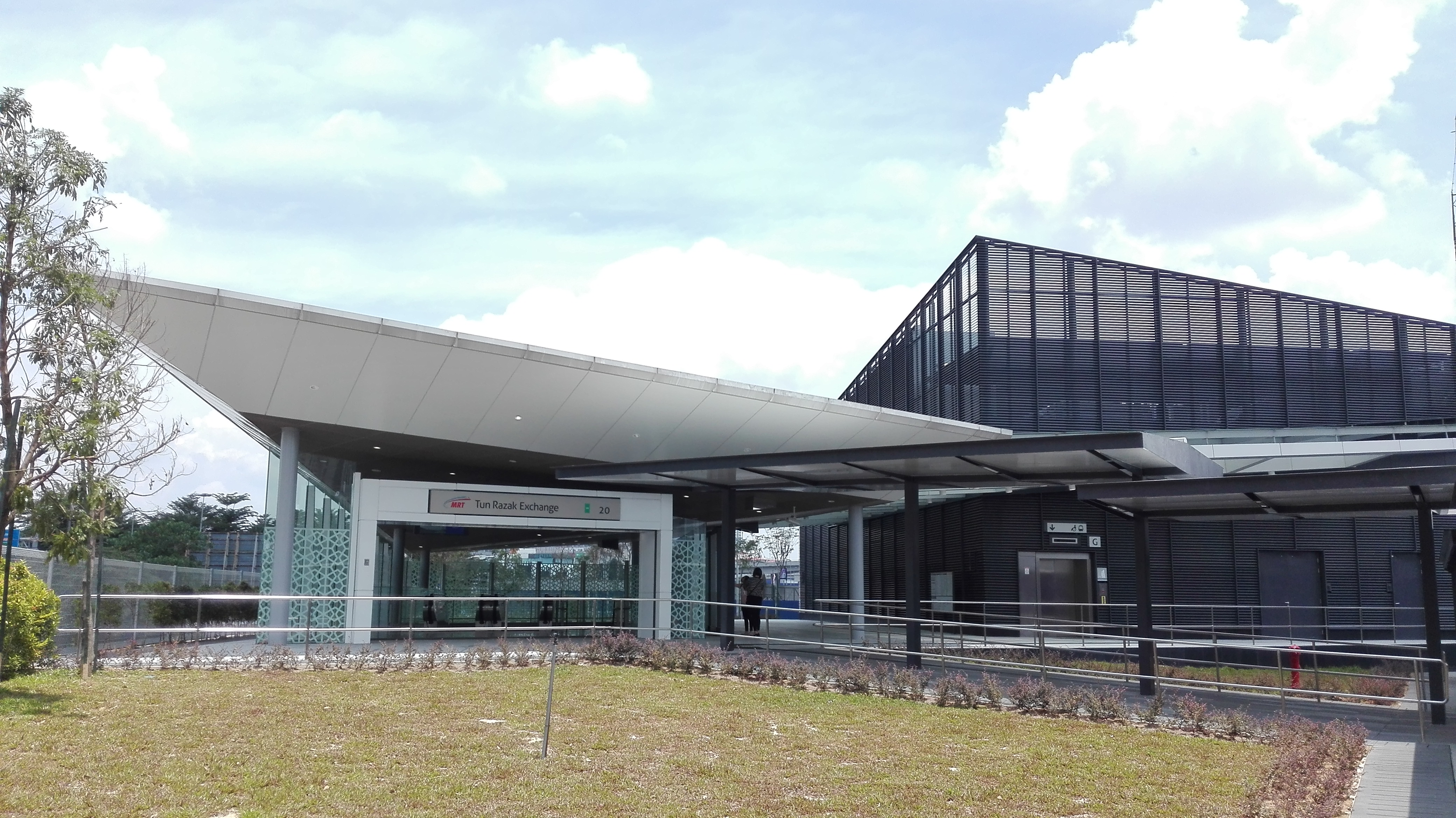
Entrance A of the Tun Razak Exchange MRT station. The station is designed to look more business-friendly, located in and named after a new financial district under development, TRX.

The KL Monorail opened on 31 August 2003 with 11 stations running 8.6 km (5 mi) on two parallel elevated tracks. It connects the KL Sentral transport hub in the south and Titiwangsa in the north with the "Golden Triangle" area of Kuala Lumpur, a commercial, shopping, and entertainment district comprising Bukit Bintang, Imbi, Sultan Ismail, and Raja Chulan. The line is currently owned by Prasarana Malaysia and operated by Rapid Rail within the Rapid KL system.

In 2016, a mass rapid transit (MRT) system was introduced to the Klang Valley. The MRT is a true metro and a heavy rail rapid transit system. The first MRT line was opened on 16 December 2016, and the network has since grown to have two fully functioning MRT lines with a third line currently under planning, scheduled to begin operating in 2030. The network currently consists of two lines – the MRT Kajang Line and the MRT Putrajaya Line. A third MRT line, the MRT Circle Line, is being planned and is scheduled to be completed by 2030, and will loop around the city. The MRT lines are owned by MRT Corp, are operated by Rapid Rail as part of the Rapid KL system, and are fully integrated with the LRT and monorail lines. The MRT system was planned with a "wheel and spoke" concept, complementing the existing rail lines.

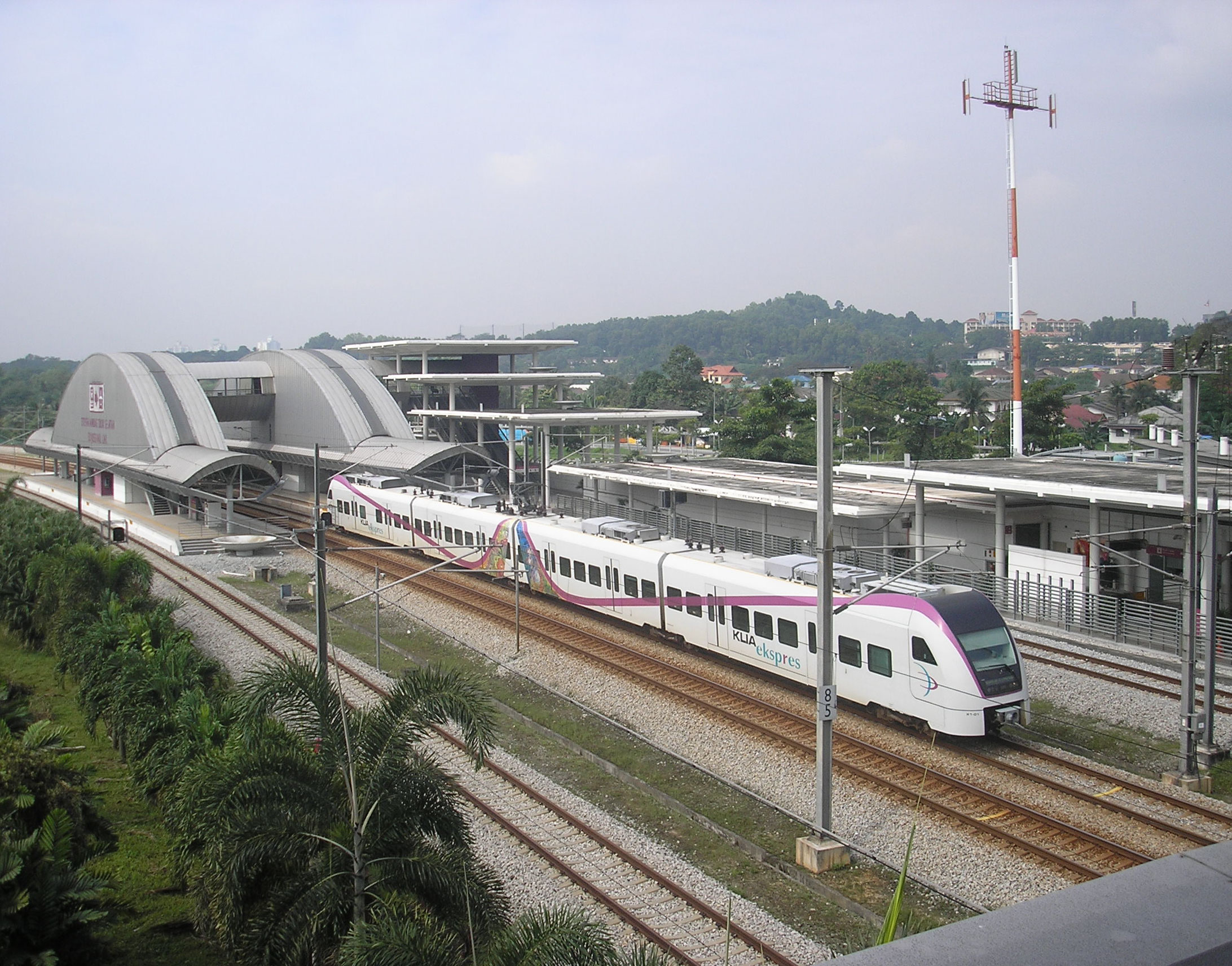
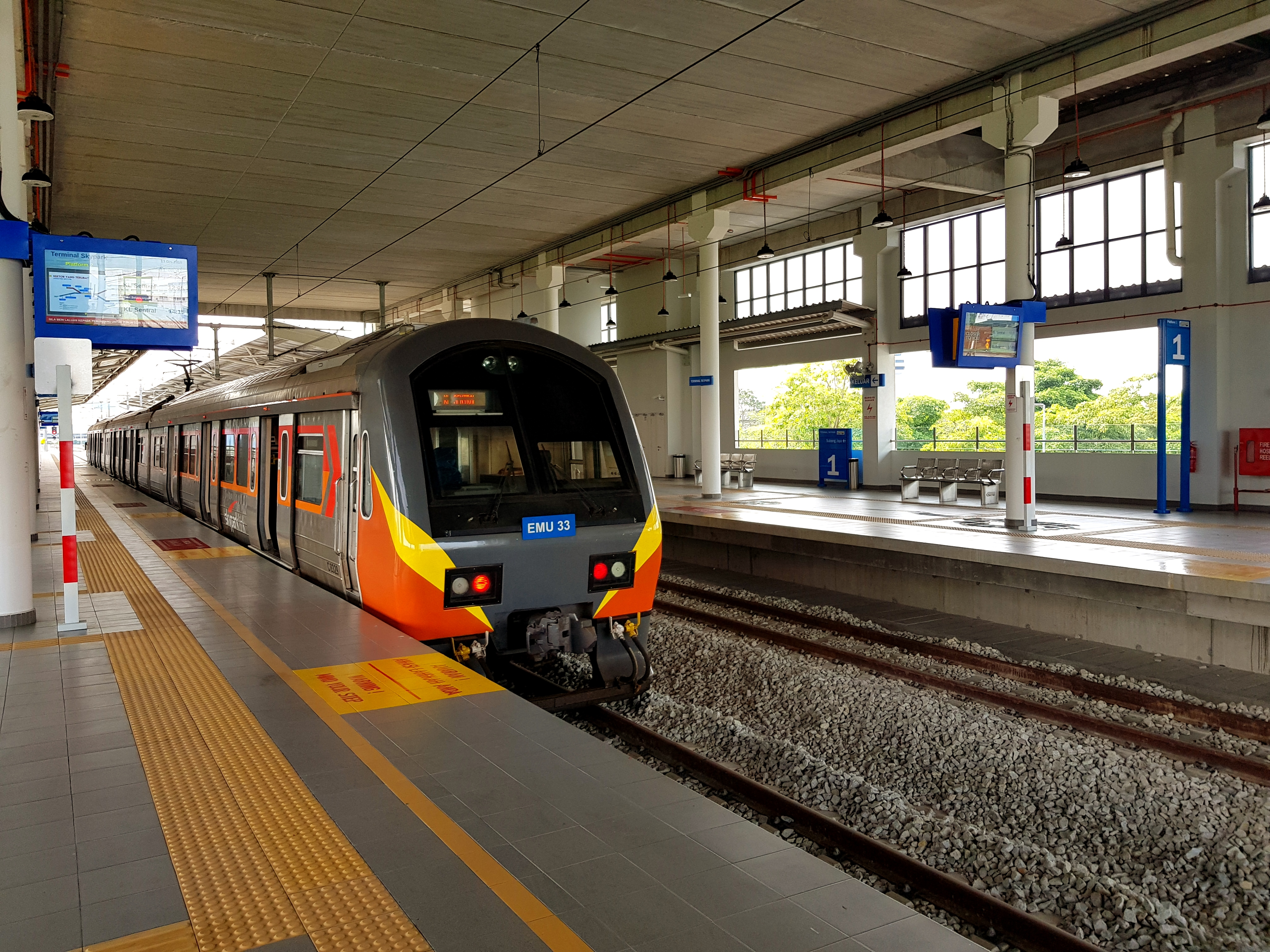
Airport rail link in Kuala Lumpur: ERL (left) and Skypark Link (right)

Kuala Lumpur is served by two airports. The main airport, the Kuala Lumpur International Airport (KLIA) at Sepang, Selangor, is located about 50 kilometres (31 mi) south of city. The other airport is Sultan Abdul Aziz Shah Airport, also known as Subang Airport, and served as the main international gateway to Kuala Lumpur from 1965 until KLIA opened in 1998. KLIA is the main hub and operating base for Malaysia's national carrier, Malaysia Airlines and the low-cost carrier AirAsia, while Subang Airport is the hub for Firefly. Both airports are also the major operating hub for Batik Air Malaysia.

Both airports are served by dedicated airport rail links. KLIA can be reached from the city via Express Rail Link's (ERL) KLIA Ekspres and KLIA Transit lines from KL Sentral station. Running on the same railway line, the KLIA Ekspres service runs non-stop between KL Sentral and KLIA's Terminal 1 and Terminal 2 stations, while the KLIA Transit service additionally serves 3 stations in between before the airport. Subang Airport is served by the KL Sentral–Terminal Skypark Line, and is owned and operated by Keretapi Tanah Melayu (KTM). All 3 lines interchange at KL Sentral, thus allowing a rail connection and transfers between KLIA and Subang Airport.

=== Buses ===
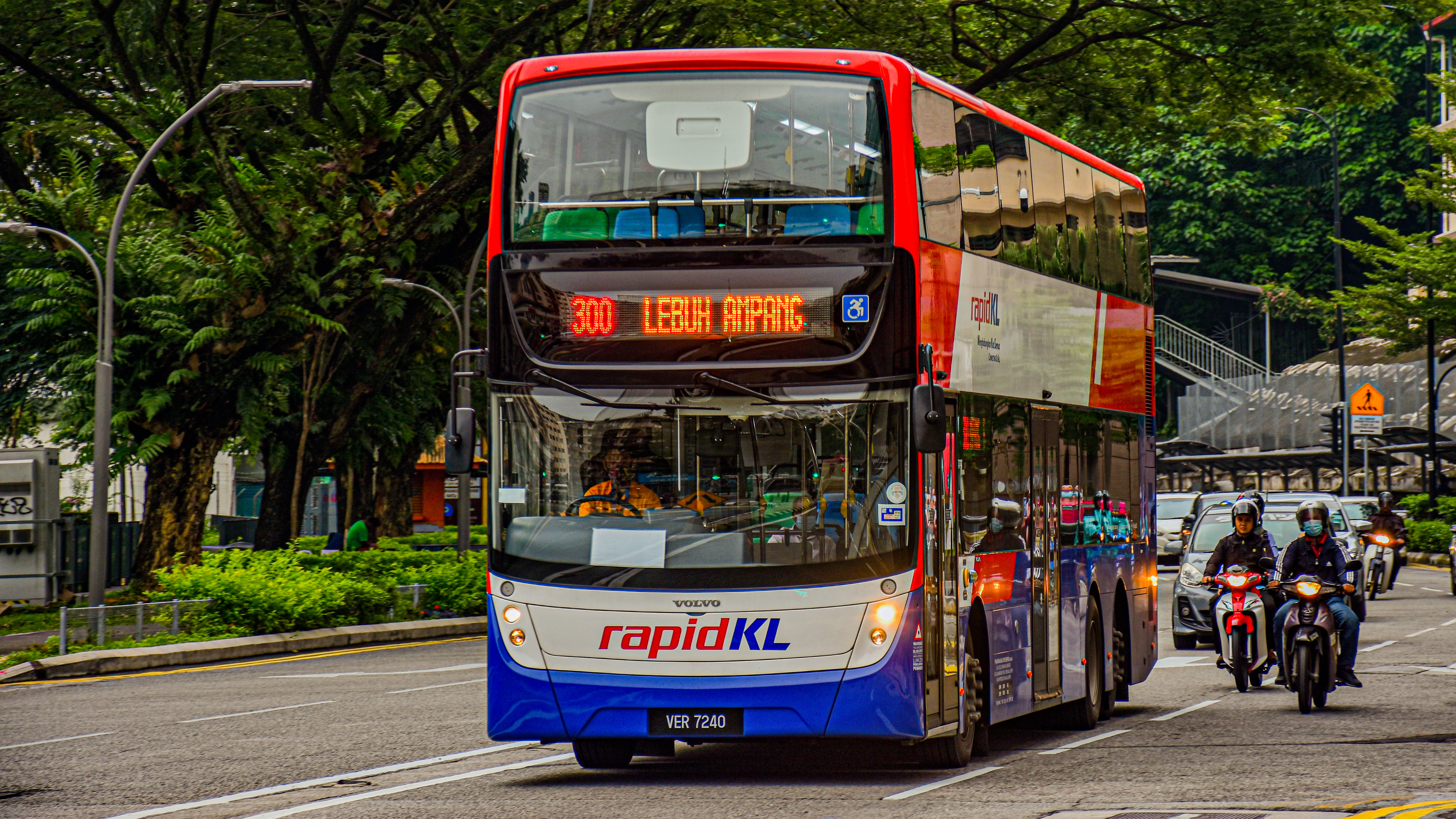
Double-deck buses crossing at Jalan Ampang

Bas Mini KL or Kuala Lumpur Mini-Bus Service was one of the oldest and most popular Malaysian public bus service, having served Kuala Lumpur and the Klang Valley region for many years. The buses were primarily painted pink with a white stripe on the sides, and had a capacity of only 20–30 passengers, due to their smaller size. The buses operated on a commission basis, with service operators paid according to the fares they collected. The mini-bus service was operared from 23 September 1975 and discontinued on 1 July 1998, replaced by the Intrakota bus services and later, Rapid Bus in 2005.

Rapid Bus began the first phase of the revamp of its bus network in January 2006, introducing 15 City Shuttle bus routes which served major areas in the Central Business District (CBD) of Kuala Lumpur. In 2008, Rapid Bus operated 167 routes with 1,400 buses covering 980 residential areas with a ridership of about 400,000 per day. The buses run between four hubs at the edge of the central business district, namely KL Sentral, Titiwangsa, Kuala Lumpur City Centre, Maluri, and Medan Pasar in the city centre. These bus hubs also serve as rail interchanges, with the exception of Medan Pasar, although it is at a walking distance from Masjid Jamek LRT station. On 18 June 2020, Rapid Bus released a new feature: real-time location of bus in Google Maps, via collaboration with Google Transit.

Effective 10 April 2019, all Rapid KL buses implemented a fully cashless journey for all routes by stages, in which the busses accept Touch n Go cards only. These systems were fully implemented by 27 May 2019. Almost 170 Rapid KL bus routes are covered with the real-time feature, which was expanded to the MRT feeder bus service. Rapid Bus is however not the only bus operator in Kuala Lumpur and the Klang Valley. Other bus operators include Selangor Omnibus, Setara Jaya Bus, and Causeway Link.

=== Taxis ===
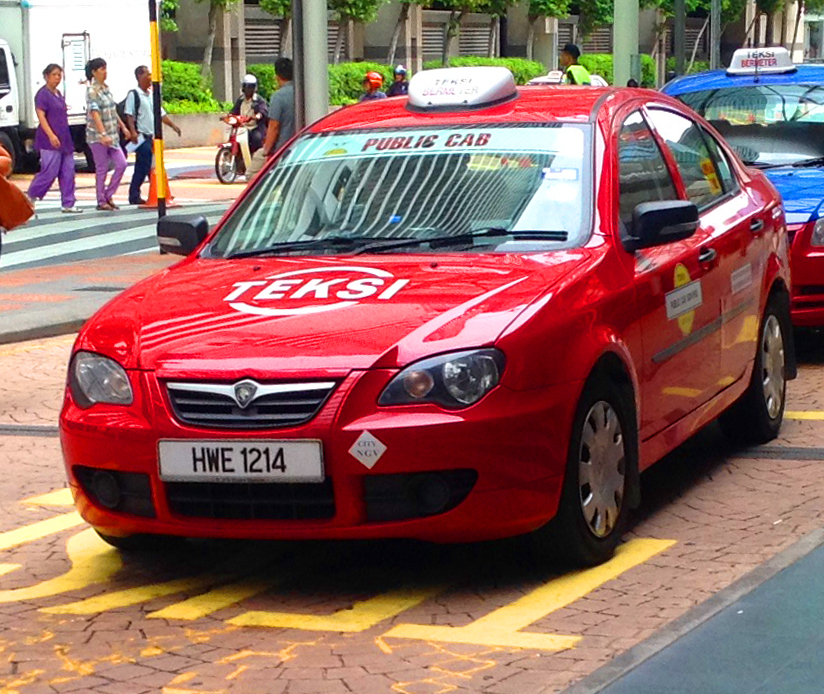
Typical public cab in Kuala Lumpur

In Kuala Lumpur, most taxis have distinctive white and red liveries. Many companies operate and maintain pools of different model of cars in their brands. Before local car production began, the Mercedes-Benz 200, Mazda 323/Ford Laser, Toyota Mark II X80 series and the Opel Kadett were used. Most were scrapped and replaced by Protons, but there are still a large number of these models running the roads. Kuala Lumpur is one of the major ASEAN cities with taxis extensively running on natural gas. Taxis can be hailed from taxi stands or from the streets. Taxis may be flagged down at any time of the day along any public road outside of the Central Business District (CBD). However, increased usage of ridesharing services like Grab, MyCar and JomRides has resulted in a decrease in taxi use.

Nevertheless, the London-based website, LondonCabs.co.uk has claimed that taxis in the city charge passengers high rates, refusing to turn on their meters and offering instead over-priced flat-rate fares, although other passengers contradict such claims. The heads of some taxi associations came out and distanced themselves from taxi drivers who had given the taxi industry a bad name, promising the public that not all taxi drivers were like that.

== Twin towns – sister cities ==
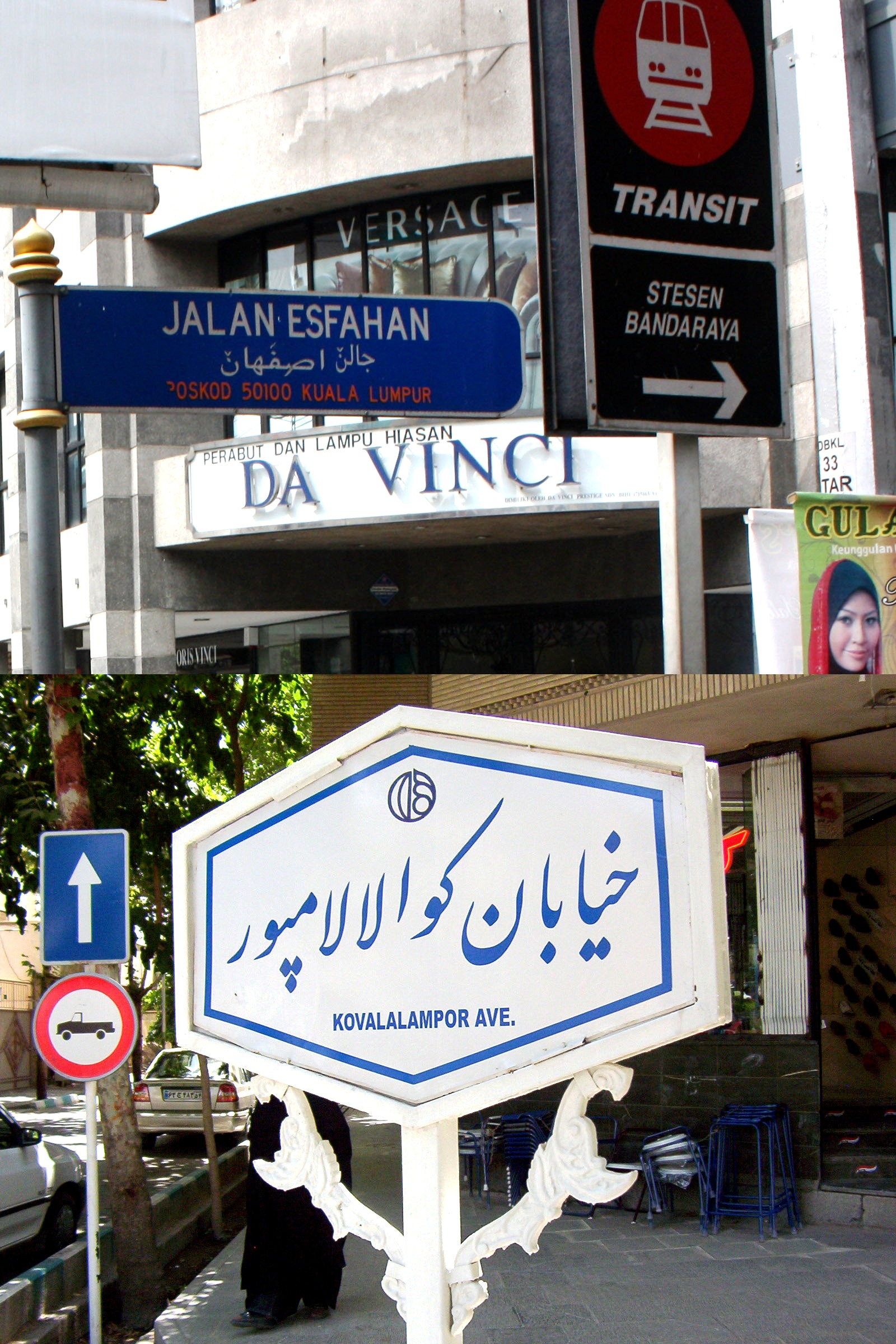
Esfahan Street (formerly Jalan Selat, Straits Road) in Kuala Lumpur (above) and Kuala Lumpur Avenue in Isfahan (below)

Kuala Lumpur is twinned with the following cities:

- Ankara, Turkey
- Casablanca, Morocco
- Chennai, India
- Dubai, United Arab Emirates
- Isfahan, Iran
- Karachi, Pakistan
- London, United Kingdom
- Malacca City, Malaysia
- Mashhad, Iran
- New York City, United States
- Osaka, Japan

== See also ==
- Cyberjaya
- Greater Kuala Lumpur
- Klang Valley
- Putrajaya
- Selangor
- Sri Garden

== Bibliography ==
- Barber, Andrew (2012). Kuala Lumpur at War, 1939–1945: A History of Kuala Lumpur and Selangor During World War Two. Karamoja Press. ISBN 978-983-43372-4-7.
- Fleming, Tom (May 2021). Malaysia: Kuala Lumpur and Wider Klang Valley (PDF) (Report). Cultural Cities Profile East Asia. Kuala Lumpur: British Council Malaysia. Archived (PDF) from the original on 31 March 2024.
- Gullick, J. M. (1955). "Kuala Lumpur, 1880–1895". Journal of the Malayan Branch of the Royal Asiatic Society. 28 (4): 1–172. JSTOR 24249151.
- Gullick, J. M. (1983). The Story of Kuala Lumpur, 1857–1939. Eastern Universities Press. ISBN 978-967-908-028-5.
- Gullick, J. M. (2000). A History of Kuala Lumpur, 1857-1939. Malaysian Branch of the Royal Asiatic Society. ISBN 978-967-9948-15-8.
