= List of children of Sulaiman of Selangor =

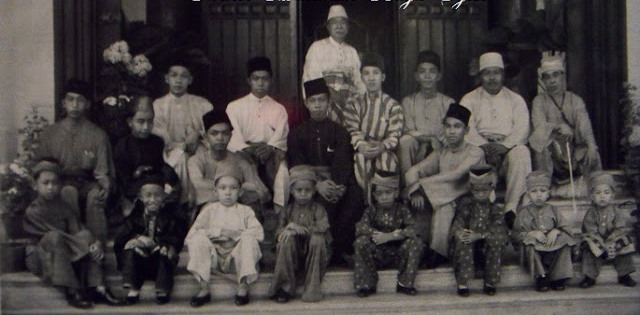
Sulaiman of Selangor with several of his sons.

Sultan Alauddin Sulaiman Shah is the fifth Sultan of Selangor. He married eleven times in his lifetime and had 44 children out of the marriages. He practiced polygamy, but per Islamic marital jurisprudence, he did not have more than four wives in the same time. He had altogether 26 sons, 18 daughters and at least one adopted daughter. He had at least one child from each marriage except from his third marriage, with a commoner, Hajah Sofia binti Haji Abdul Ghani, from which they have no child.

== Background ==
Sulaiman of Selangor was officially installed as Sultan of Selangor on 22 October 1903, despite already being proclaimed in 1899. On 4 November 1903, he gave titles to all his five children with his first royal consort, Tunku Maharum as a symbol to elevate their status. His son, Tengku Musaeddin was given the title Tengku Putera Mahkota, while his four daughters, Tengku Maheran, Tengku Fatimah, Tengku Arfah and Tengku Zahrah were given the title Tengku Puteri. On 5 November 1903, he decreed that all his descendants will carry the hereditary first name Tengku instead of Raja.

Tengku Musaeddin, as the eldest son, was made Raja Muda (the crown prince) on 1920 but he was dismissed from his position on 1934 after he was accused of misbehaving by British Resident, Theodore Samuel Adams (1885 – 1961; in office 1935 – 1937). His accusation of the prince being a gambling addict among others was noted by historian as unconvincing and it was theorised that Adams was angry that Tengku Musaeddin refused to follow Adams' order. Tengku Alam Shah, Sulaiman's third son, was made Raja Muda on 20 July 1936 instead, overtaking his elder brother, Tengku Badar Shah. Nevertheless, both Tengku Alam Shah and Tengku Musaeddin became the sixth and seventh Sultan of Selangor, taking the regnal name Sultan Hisamuddin Alam Shah and Sultan Musa Ghiatuddin Riayat Shah respectively.

Two of Sulaiman's daughters became queen consorts. Tengku Puteri Zahrah became the queen consort of Langkat after marrying Sultan Abdul Aziz, the Sultan of Langkat, and was given the title Tengku Permaisuri Zahrah. Tengku Raihani married Sultan Sir Ahmad Tajuddin of Brunei as his second wife, taking the title Tengku Ampuan Raihani, (Note: Sultan Ahmad Tajuddin's first wife is a commoner, therefore Tengku Raihani overtook her as his royal consort despite not having seniority) holding the title from 1934 until 1956. She relinquished the title upon remarrying after the Sultan's death.

Some of his grandchildren married each other in cousin marriages. His grandson, Tengku Abdul Aziz, who ascended the throne as the eighth Sultan of Selangor and taking the regnal name Sultan Salahuddin Abdul Aziz Shah married his cousin in his first marriage, Raja Nur Saidatul Ihsan binti Tengku Badar Shah in 1943. The couple later divorced. Later, he married another cousin, Tengku Ampuan Rahimah on 1956 until her death in 1993.

== Issues ==
List of Sulaiman of Selangor's issues and their children in order of their birth dates:

| # | Name | Lifetime | Parentage (Note: Mother's name are their full name without titles) | Marriage | Children |
|---|---|---|---|---|---|
| 1 | Tengku Musaeddin Shah, Tengku Kelana Jaya Putera (Sultan Musa Ghiatuddin Riayat Shah from 1942 – 1945) | born 9 December 1893 died 8 November 1955 (aged 61) | son of Tunku Maharum binti Tunku Kudin | (1) Sharifah Mastura binti Tengku Suri Syed Ahmad Shahabuddin of Kedah (Tengku Permaisuri Sharifah Mastura from 1942 – 1945) (Note: His first cousin, daughter of Tunku Mariam binti Sultan Abdul Samad of Selangor, and granddaughter of Sultan Zainal Rashid Al-Mu'adzam Shah I of Kedah); 1912 no children | |
| 1 | Tengku Musaeddin Shah, Tengku Kelana Jaya Putera (Sultan Musa Ghiatuddin Riayat Shah from 1942 – 1945) | born 9 December 1893 died 8 November 1955 (aged 61) | son of Tunku Maharum binti Tunku Kudin | (2) Tengku Jeriah binti Tengku Ariffin of Selasai, Langkat | |
| 1 | Tengku Musaeddin Shah, Tengku Kelana Jaya Putera (Sultan Musa Ghiatuddin Riayat Shah from 1942 – 1945) | born 9 December 1893 died 8 November 1955 (aged 61) | son of Tunku Maharum binti Tunku Kudin | (3) Che Puan Anjang binti Abdullah | |
| 2 | Tengku Badar Shah, Raja Bendahara | born 18 April 1893, died 30 October 1945 (aged 52) | son of Cik Hasnah binti Pilong | (1) Raja Ambin binti Sultan Abdul Jalil Nasiruddin Shah of Perak; 1917; 3 children | Raja Nur Akmar; Raja Nur Haniza (Note: Married her first cousin, Raja Mahmud, son of Tengku Puteri Maheran); Raja Nur Saidatul Ihsan, Paduka Bonda Raja (Note: Married her first cousin, Tengku Abdul Aziz Shah who later became Salahuddin of Selangor, son of Tengku Alam Shah. Received the title Paduka Bonda Raja upon her son's Sultan Sharafuddin Idris Shah ascension to the throne.) |
| 2 | Tengku Badar Shah, Raja Bendahara | born 18 April 1893, died 30 October 1945 (aged 52) | son of Cik Hasnah binti Pilong | (2) Raja Nur binti Raja Jumaat; 1 child | Raja Azian (Note: Married her first cousin, Raja Redzwan, son of Tengku Badariah) |
| 2 | Tengku Badar Shah, Raja Bendahara | born 18 April 1893, died 30 October 1945 (aged 52) | son of Cik Hasnah binti Pilong | (3) Raja Indira binti Raja Ahmad; 2 children | Tengku Muhammad Tahir; Tengku Shahrani |
| 3 | Tengku Puteri Maheran | born 6 November 1894, died 26 February 1981 (aged 86) | daughter of Tunku Maharum binti Tunku Kudin | Raja Othman bin Raja Yahya Sani (Note: Her first cousin, grandson of Sultan Abdul Samad Shah); 7 children | Raja Mahmud (Note: Married his first cousin, Raja Nur Haniza, daughter of Tengku Badar Shah) |
| 4 | Tengku Badariah | born 3 September 1896, died 11 February 1937 (aged 40) | daughter of Cik Hasnah binti Pilong | Raja Tun Uda bin Raja Muhammad (Note: Her fifth cousin, great great great great grandson of Salehuddin of Selangor) circa 1925; 3 children | Raja Kamaruddin; Raja Redzwan (Note: Married his first cousin, Raja Azian, daughter of Tengku Badar Shah); Raja Mahmud |
| 5 | Tengku Puteri Fatimah | born 5 December 1896, died 24 December 1968 (aged 72) | daughter of Tunku Maharum binti Tunku Kudin | Raja Mahadi bin Raja Sulaiman; 6 children | |
| 6 | Tengku Puteri Arfah | born 24 January 1898, died 5 August 1961 (aged 63) | daughter of Tunku Maharum binti Tunku Kudin | Raja Adnan bin Raja Basuk, Engku Seri Paduka Panglima Dalam (Note: Her first cousin twice removed, great grandson of Ibrahim Shah of Selangor); 2 children | |
| 7 | Tengku Alam Shah (Sultan Hisamuddin Alam Shah from 1938 – 1942 and from 1942 –1960) | born 13 May 1898, died 1 September 1960 (aged 62) | son of Cik Hasnah binti Pilong | (1) Raja Jemaah binti Raja Ahmad of Selangor, Tengku Ampuan; 1919; 1 child | Tengku Abdul Aziz Shah, later Sultan Salahuddin Abdul Aziz Shah (Note: Married his first cousins, Raja Nur Saidatul Ihsan, daughter of Tengku Badar Shah and Tengku Rahimah, daughter of Tengku Permaisuri Zaharah) |
| 7 | Tengku Alam Shah (Sultan Hisamuddin Alam Shah from 1938 – 1942 and from 1942 –1960) | born 13 May 1898, died 1 September 1960 (aged 62) | son of Cik Hasnah binti Pilong | (2) Che Puan Kalsum binti Haji Mahmud; 1927; 6 children | Tengku Badli Shah, Tengku Laksamana; Tengku Sharifah Raudzah, Raja Puan Muda Kedah (Note: Married Tunku Abdul Malik ibni Sultan Badlishah of Kedah, Raja Muda Kedah); Tengku Azman Shah, Tengku Bendahara; Tengku Bariah, Tengku Ampuan of Terengganu; Tengku Ismail Shah; Tengku Taksiah |
| 7 | Tengku Alam Shah (Sultan Hisamuddin Alam Shah from 1938 – 1942 and from 1942 –1960) | born 13 May 1898, died 1 September 1960 (aged 62) | son of Cik Hasnah binti Pilong | (3) Raja Halijah binti Paduka Seri Sultan Sir Idris Murshidul Azzam Shah Rahmatullah of Perak, Tengku Ampuan | Tengku Hajah Calipha |
| 8 | Tengku Puteri Zahrah (Tengku Permaisuri Zahrah of Langkat from December 1919 – 18 January 1982) | born 18 February 1899, died 18 January 1982 (aged 82) | daughter of Tunku Maharum binti Tunku Kudin | Paduka Seri Tuanku Sultan Abdul Aziz Rahmat Shah, Sultan of Langkat; December 1919; 5 children | Tengku Abdul Samad; Tengku Dziauddin; Tengku Aizah; Tengku Mariam; Tengku Rahimah, Tengku Ampuan (Note: Married her first cousin, Tengku Abdul Aziz Shah who later became Salahuddin of Selangor, son of Tengku Alam Shah) |
| 9 | Tengku Salwa | born 25 April 1901, died 2 March 1972 (aged 70) | daughter of Cik Hasnah binti Pilong | Raja Nong bin Raja Husain, Tengku Panglima Diraja; 3 children | Raja Toh Puan Badariah (Note: Married her first cousin, Raja Uzair, son of Tengku Zainal Rashid Shah); Raja Abdul Hamid (Note: Married his first cousin, Raja Nahariah, daughter of Tengku Muhammad Khalid Shah) |
| 10 | Tengku Khadijah @ Tengku Yong | born 15 July 1909, died 2001 (aged 91–92) | daughter of Cik Chik binti Abdullah | Raja Yusuf bin Raja Jumaat, Engku Panglima Setia; 7 children | Raja Haidar; Raja Abdullah Suran; Raja Nor Aini (Note: Married Raja Shahar bin Raja Hitam, Engku Panglima Perang of Kiri); Raja Ibrahim; Raja Azman Shah (Note: Married Tunku Mashitoh binti Tunku Abdul Rahman Halim Shah of Kedah); Raja Maheran (Note: Married her first cousin, Raja Usman, son of Tengku Muhammad Khalid Shah) |
| 11 | Tengku Abdul Aziz Shah, Tengku Indera Setia Diraja | born 17 September 1909, died 3 February 1992 (aged 82) | son of Cik Rogayah binti Muhammad Amin | (1) Tunku Badrul Jamil Marudziya binti Tunku Muhammad of Kedah (Note: Granddaughter of Sultan Abdul Hamid Halim Shah of Kedah); 5 children | Tengku Norpisah; Tengku Pengiran (Note: Married his cousin, Seri Pengiran Anak Puteri Hajah Nur Insani binti Sultan Sir Ahmad Tajuddin Akhazul Khairuwaddin of Brunei, daughter of Tengku Raihani); Tengku Mariam; Tengku Bidarah; Tengku Sulaiman |
| 11 | Tengku Abdul Aziz Shah, Tengku Indera Setia Diraja | born 17 September 1909, died 3 February 1992 (aged 82) | son of Cik Rogayah binti Muhammad Amin | (2) Sharifah Hasnah binti Syed Zain Shahabuddin; 12 children | Tengku Ahmad Tajuddin; Tengku Husain; Tengku Anaim; Tengku Jamaluddin; Tengku Faisal; Raja Abdullah; Tengku Yakub; Tengku Azaham; Tengku Zubaidah; Tengku Aznin; Tengku Noor Hazah (Note: Married Raja Izzuddin Iskandar Shah bin Sultan Idris II of Perak); Tengku Fatimah |
| 12 | Tengku Ibrahim Shah | born circa 1911, died in infancy | son of Cik Maimunah binti Abdullah | | |
| 13 | Tengku Raihani (Tengku Ampuan Raihani of Brunei from 1934 – 1956) | born 11 October 1911, died 22 September 1993 (aged 81) of renal cancer | daughter of Cik Maimunah binti Abdullah | (1) Raja Badri Shah bin Raja Harun al-Rashid of Perak (Note: Grandson of Sultan Sir Idris of Perak) div. no children | |
| 13 | Tengku Raihani (Tengku Ampuan Raihani of Brunei from 1934 – 1956) | born 11 October 1911, died 22 September 1993 (aged 81) of renal cancer | daughter of Cik Maimunah binti Abdullah | (2) Paduka Seri Sultan Sir Ahmad Tajuddin Akhaz al-Khairwaruddin of Brunei; 30 April 1934 – d. 4 June 1950; 1 child | Paduka Seri Pangiran Anak Puteri Besar Hajah Nur Ihsani (Note: Married her first cousin, Tengku Pengiran, son of Tengku Abdul Aziz) |
| 13 | Tengku Raihani (Tengku Ampuan Raihani of Brunei from 1934 – 1956) | born 11 October 1911, died 22 September 1993 (aged 81) of renal cancer | daughter of Cik Maimunah binti Abdullah | (3) Raja Kamiluddin bin Raja Harun al-Rashid (Note: Brother to her first husband, grandson of Sultan Sir Idris of Perak); 18 August 1956 no children | |
| 14 | Tengku Ahmad Alham Shah, Tengku Pahlawan Diraja | born 22 October 1911, died 9 April 1991 (aged 79) | son of Cik Chik binti Abdullah | (1) Tengku Puteri Kisman Jaajan binti Sultan Ismail I of Kelantan; 3 September 1935 no children | |
| 14 | Tengku Ahmad Alham Shah, Tengku Pahlawan Diraja | born 22 October 1911, died 9 April 1991 (aged 79) | son of Cik Chik binti Abdullah | (2) Kalsum binti Hashim; 1938; 1 child | Tengku Bedarsari |
| 14 | Tengku Ahmad Alham Shah, Tengku Pahlawan Diraja | born 22 October 1911, died 9 April 1991 (aged 79) | son of Cik Chik binti Abdullah | (3) Tengku Fatimah binti Tengku Husain; 1951; 2 children | Tengku Amir Farouk Shaifullah; Tengku Fauriza Akbal Hanim |
| 15 | Tengku Zainal Karib Shah, Tengku Panglima Besar | born 15 December 1911, died 4 December 1984 (aged 72) | son of Raja Zubaidah binti Sultan Abdul Jalil | (1) Tengku Rafiah binti Sultan Sir Iskandar Shah of Perak; 22 January 1935; 8 children | Tengku Sulaiman; Tengku Azam Iskandar; Tengku Hasan Nazri; Tengku Muzaffar; Tengku Abdullah; Tengku Zubaidah (Note: Married her first cousin, Raja Anuwar, son of Tengku Zainal Rashid Shah); Tengku Azmi Karib; Tengku Shaharul Zuhar |
| 15 | Tengku Zainal Karib Shah, Tengku Panglima Besar | born 15 December 1911, died 4 December 1984 (aged 72) | son of Raja Zubaidah binti Sultan Abdul Jalil | (2) Raja Nur Akmal binti Raja Bahari circa 1953; 8 children | Tengku Nazima; Tengku Abdul Aziz; Tengku Norizah (Note: Married her first cousin once removed, Raja Abdul Hamid bin Raja Nong, grandson of Tengku Muhammad Khalid Shah as her first husband); Tengku Nor Izan (Note: Married her first cousin, Tengku Muhammad Amin, son of Tengku Mahmud Shah); Tengku Nor Aziah; Tengku Musa; Tengku Yusuf; Tengku Shahril |
| 16 | Tengku Zainal @ Zainon Rashid Shah, Tengku Seri Paduka Diraja | born 24 April 1913, died 29 August 1989 (aged 76) | son of Raja Zubaidah binti Sultan Abdul Jalil | Raja Norhibah binti Raja Shuib of Perak (Note: Granddaughter of Sultan Sir Idris of Perak); 20 January 1935; 6 children | Raja Anuwar (Note: Married his first cousin, Tengku Zubaidah, daughter of Tengku Zainal Karib Shah); Raja Uzair (Note: Married his first cousin, Raja Badariah binti Raja Nong, daughter of Tengku Salwa); Raja Amin; Raja Zakiah; Raja Haidar; Raja Faridah |
| 17 | Tengku Akram Shah, Tengku Seri Asmara Diraja | born 24 April 1913 | son of Cik Bidayah binti Ahmad | Raja Raihan binti Raja Abdul Murad (Note: His first cousin, granddaughter of Raja Muda Musa of Selangor); 2 January 1939 at least 5 children | Tengku Hamzah; Tengku Abdul Murad (Note: Married his first cousin, Raja Maharian binti Raja Izzet, daughter of Tengku Zahariah, as his first wife); Tengku Ibrahim; Tengku Aman Shah; Tengku Intan Zaitunnisa |
| 18 | Tengku Muhammad Khalid Shah, Tengku Indera Bijaya Diraja | born 1914 | son of Cik Chik binti Abdullah | (1) Pangiran Anak Hajah Siti Saerah binti Sultan Sir Ahmad Tajuddin of Brunei div. 2 children | Pangiran Anak Hajah Nur Asikin; Pangiran Anak Hajah Nur Akmar |
| 18 | Tengku Muhammad Khalid Shah, Tengku Indera Bijaya Diraja | born 1914 | son of Cik Chik binti Abdullah | (2) Raja Chik binti Raja Kulun; 1 child | Raja Othman (Note: Married his first cousin, Raja Maheran binti Raja Yusuf, daughter of Tengku Khadijah) |
| 18 | Tengku Muhammad Khalid Shah, Tengku Indera Bijaya Diraja | born 1914 | son of Cik Chik binti Abdullah | (3) Jamilah binti Musa; 5 children | Raja Kamarulzaman; Raja Hisham; Raja Khalijah; Raja Hanizah; Raja Fatimah |
| 18 | Tengku Muhammad Khalid Shah, Tengku Indera Bijaya Diraja | born 1914 | son of Cik Chik binti Abdullah | (4) Cik Aishah binti Abdullah circa 1947; 6 children | Raja Zainal Abidin; Tengku Azian; Raja Naharian (Note: Married her first cousin, Raja Abdul Hamid bin Raja Nong, son of Tengku Salwa); Raja Maharani; Raja Rabiah; Raja Shahrezade |
| 18 | Tengku Muhammad Khalid Shah, Tengku Indera Bijaya Diraja | born 1914 | son of Cik Chik binti Abdullah | (5) Raja Maimunah circa 1941; 1 child | Tengku Zaharah |
| 19 | Tengku Nur Ashiha | born 30 November 1914 | daughter of Raja Zubaidah binti Sultan Abdul Jalil | Raja Muhammad bin Raja Murad, Engku Rakna Juwita Diraja Selangor (Note: Her first cousin, grandson of Raja Muda Musa of Selangor); 27 June 1937; 3 children | |
| 20 | Tengku Muhammad Uzab @ Muzab Shah, Tengku Perdana Diraja | born 7 April 1915 | son of Cik Maimunah binti Abdullah | Tunku Zakiyah binti Sultan Abdul Hamid Halim of Kedah; 1 child | Raja Hizan Shah |
| 21 | Tengku Nur Aishah | born 6 December 1915, died 20 December 1962 (aged 47) | daughter of Raja Zubaidah binti Sultan Abdul Jalil | Raja Bon bin Raja Yahya Sani (Note: Her first cousin, grandson of Raja Muda Musa of Selangor) | |
| 22 | Tengku Ibrahim Shah, Tengku Seri Wangsa Diraja | born 17 April 1916 | son of Raja Zubaidah binti Sultan Abdul Jalil | Raja Pok Saidatul Izul Hajah binti Sultan Sir Yusuf Izzuddin Shah of Perak; 6 children | Tengku Mariam Khalida; Tengku Amir Sharifuddin @ Faisal (Note: Married his first cousin, Tengku Taksiah, daughter of Tengku Alam Shah, as his second wife); Tengku Nasaruddin; Tengku Najmuddin; Tengku Malik Adian; Tengku Habshah Izma |
| 23 | Tengku Zahariah | born 28 June 1916, died 1 March 1951 (aged 34) | daughter of Cik Bidayah binti Ahmad | Raja Izzet bin Raja Mahmud at least 1 child | Raja Maharian (Note: Married her first cousin, Tengku Abdul Murad, son of Tengku Akram Shah) |
| 24 | Tengku Shaharuddin Shah, Tengku Andika Seri Amar Diraja | born 11 April 1918 | son of Cik Bidayah binti Ahmad | Raja Nur Zainun Nisa binti Raja Harun al-Rashid (Note: Granddaughter of Sultan Sir Idris of Perak); 5 children | Tengku Ramli; Tengku Zainuddin Shah; Tengku Muhammad Kamil (Note: Married his first cousin, Tengku Raziah, daughter of Tengku Idris Shah); Tengku Fatimah; Tengku Ainor Jasmi |
| 25 | Tengku Idris Shah, Tengku Seri Paduka Shahbandar | born 30 April 1918 | son of Raja Zubaidah binti Sultan Abdul Jalil | (1) Tengku Ruqiyah binti Tengku Temenggong Abdul Aziz of Pahang; 7 children | Tengku Amir Fuad; Tengku Mustafa; Tengku Sulaiman; Tengku Raizul Azwar; Tengku Nur Munira; Tengku Raziah (Note: Married her first cousin, Tengku Muhammad Kamil, son of Tengku Shaharuddin Shah); Tengku Faridah |
| 25 | Tengku Idris Shah, Tengku Seri Paduka Shahbandar | born 30 April 1918 | son of Raja Zubaidah binti Sultan Abdul Jalil | (2) Tengku Puteri Mariam binti Sultan Sir Abu Bakar Riayatuddin of Pahang; 13 March 1949; 1 child | Tengku Kamil Ismail |
| 26 | Tengku Abdul Halim Shah, Tengku Seri Maharaja Diraja | born 12 October 1918, died 7 August 1985 (aged 66) | son of Cik Maimunah binti Abdullah | Tengku Wuk Atiqah binti Sultan Sulaiman Badrul Alam Shah of Terengganu; 4 children | Tengku Hilmi Sulaiman; Tengku Abdul Kahar; Tengku Mariam; Tengku Saidatul Akmar |
| 27 | Tengku Nur Saadah | born 7 November 1922 | daughter of Raja Fatimah binti Sultan Sir Idris | Raja Tun Uda bin Raja Muhammad (Note: Her fifth cousin, great-great-great-great-grandson of Sallehuddin of Selangor, former husband of her elder sister, Tengku Badariah until her death); 30 July 1939; 8 children | Raja Fuzian; Raja Muhammad Afif; Raja Zulkifli @ Ahmad Shakir (Note: Married his cousin, Raja Bismayazan, daughter of Tengku Safiah); Raja Sulaiman; Raja Zainunnur; Raja Abdul Haq; Raja Arshad; Raja Sharif |
| 28 | Tengku Muhammad Tahir | born 25 May 1923, died 5 January 1943 (aged 19) | son of Cik Bidayah binti Ahmad | | |
| 29 | Tengku Safiah | born 16 July 1923 | daughter of Cik Chik binti Abdullah | Raja Arif Shah bin Raja Harun al-Rashid (Note: Grandson of Sultan Idris Murshidul Azzam Shah of Perak); 3 children | Raja Sallehuddin; Raja Ainul Bismi; Raja Bismayazan (Note: Married her first cousin, Raja Zulkifli @ Ahmad Shakir bin Raja Tun Uda, son of Tengku Nur Saadah) |
| 30 | Tengku Mahyun | born 1924 | daughter of Cik Chik binti Abdullah | | |
| 31 | Tengku Nur Anwar | born 16 February 1924 (age 102) | daughter of Raja Fatimah binti Sultan Sir Idris | Raja Mohsin bin Raja Shuib (Note: Grandson of Sultan Sir Idris Murshidul Azzam Shah of Perak) circa 1947; 8 children | Raja Maziah; Raja Nizam Sulaiman; Raja Muhammad Nazeri (Note: Married his first cousin, Tengku Nur Kamar, daughter of Tengku Abdul Jalil Shah); Raja Norayan; Raja Nor Asmah; Raja Abdul Rahman; Raja Jamaluddin; Raja Nor Zihan |
| 32 | Tengku Shaharul Bariah | born 1 December 1924 | daughter of Cik Bidayah binti Ahmad | (1) Raja Ismail bin Raja Abdullah; 2 children | |
| 32 | Tengku Shaharul Bariah | born 1 December 1924 | daughter of Cik Bidayah binti Ahmad | (2) Raja Aznir Shah bint Raja Salim; 1 child | Tengku Nor Hayati |
| 33 | Tengku Yaacob Shah | born 7 March 1925, died 4 December 1959 (aged 34) in a car crash | son of Cik Chik binti Abdullah | Che Puan Zaleha binti Abdullah; 1951; 1 child | Raja Iskandar @ Alex |
| 34 | Tengku Mahmud Shah | born 24 September 1925 (age 100) | son of Cik Maimunah binti Abdullah | (1) Raja Habshah binti Raja Muhammad Bai of Riau circa 1950; 9 children | Tengku Jamaluddin; Tengku Rahimah; Tengku Muhammad Jamil; Tengku Muhammad Amin (Note: Married his first cousin, Tengku Nor Izan, daughter of Tengku Zainal Karib Shah); Tengku Shahzan; Tengku Muhammad Kamal; Tengku Sofia; Tengku Fatimah; Tengku Forzah |
| 34 | Tengku Mahmud Shah | born 24 September 1925 (age 100) | son of Cik Maimunah binti Abdullah | (2) Suaibah binti Muhammad Said no children | |
| 35 | Tengku Nur Ashikin Khaladiah | born 1925, died 16 January 2013 (aged 87–88) | daughter of Raja Fatimah binti Sultan Sir Idris | Raja Muhammad Rizwan bin Raja Yakub; 3 children | |
| 36 | Tengku Abdul Jalil Shah, Tengku Seri Perkasa | born 22 March 1926 | son of Raja Bulat binti Raja Ahmad | (1) Raja Aishah binti Raja Petra circa 1948; 6 children | Tengku Nur Kamar (Note: Married her first cousin, Raja Muhammad Nazeri bin Raja Mohsin, son of Tengku Nur Anwar, as her first husband); Tengku Nur Akmar; Tengku Nur Kamaliah; Tengku Nur Jamaliah; Tengku Sulaiman Shah; Tengku Harris Fadzillah |
| 36 | Tengku Abdul Jalil Shah, Tengku Seri Perkasa | born 22 March 1926 | son of Raja Bulat binti Raja Ahmad | (2) Sharifah Isah binti Syed Ali circa 1961; 3 children | Tengku Marudin Shah; Tengku Said; Tengku Kursiah |
| 37 | Tengku Muhammad Yusof Shah, Tengku Aris Temenggong | born 28 April 1926, died 3 January 2018 (aged 91) | son of Raja Fatimah binti Sultan Sir Idris | Raja Saidatul Ezzam binti Raja Lope Nur Rashid; December 1953 – d. 16 October 2014; 10 children | Tengku Muhammad Sharifuddin; Tengku Muhammad Yakub; Tengku Nariman; Tengku Mulfi; Tengku Yasmin; Tengku Soraya; Tengku Zarina; Tengku Malek Narzarian; Tengku Zerah; Tengku Farah |
| 38 | Tengku Aziah | born 1 July 1926 | daughter of Cik Chik binti Abdullah | Raja Khalid bin Raja Harun of Minangkabau; 2 children | |
| 39 | Tengku Abdul Rahman | born 5 September 1927 | son of Raja Fatimah binti Sultan Sir Idris | | |
| 40 | Tengku Abdul Murad Shah | born 22 September 1928 (age 97) | son of Raja Bulat binti Raja Ahmad | Raja Rabitahani binti Raja Brima; 7 children | Tengku Ahmad Tajuddin; Tengku Abdul Rahman; Tengku Tahar al-Fasni; Tengku Harris Fadzillah; Tengku Saidatul Zihan; Tengku Faizan; Tengku Naizatul Shima |
| 41 | Tengku Abdul Hamid Shah | born 19 March 1930 | son of Raja Bulat binti Raja Ahmad | (1) Tengku Nur Aizan binti Tengku Muhammad Nur Aziz of Langkat; 1951 (2) Tengku Zaitun binti Tengku Muhammad Yasin | Tengku Raizul Anwar; Tengku Ardy Esfandiari; Tengku Farah Liza |
| 42 | Tengku Abdul Samad Shah | born 20 July 1933 | son of Raja Bulat binti Raja Ahmad | Che Puan Rohani binti Abdullah circa 1951; 5 children | Tengku Nur Ashikin; Tengku Rahimah; Tengku Hamsiah; Tengku Muhammad; Tengku Ibrahim |
| 43 | Tengku Harun Shah | born 6 July 1934 | son of Cik Johari binti Abdullah | (1) Raja Aizan binti Raja Bon circa 1955; 6 children | Tengku Muhammad; Tengku Nasharuddin; Tengku Saidatul Amira; Tengku Saidatul Nazmi; Tengku Shamsul Bahariah; Tengku Nur Zehan |
| 43 | Tengku Harun Shah | born 6 July 1934 | son of Cik Johari binti Abdullah | (2) Che Puan Ruqiyah binti Ibrahim circa 1958; 5 children | Tengku Farida; Tengku Maznah; Tengku Mazlina; Tengku Amir Saifuddin; Tengku Azli |
| 44 | Tengku Azlan Shah | born 26 April 1936 | son of Cik Johari binti Abdullah | Raja Asma binti Raja Berhanian; 1961; 5 children | Tengku Ruzita; Tengku Zuraini; Tengku Jamaliah; Tengku Shahabuddin; Tengku Jalaluddin |

== See also ==
- House of Opu Daeng Chelak
- Selangor Sultanate
