= Dutch–Selangor war (1784–1786) =

Conflict over the Malay Peninsula tin trade

- Part of the Dutch colonial campaigns in Asia
Date	July 1784 – June 19, 1786
Location	Bukit Malawati, Malay Peninsula
Result	Selangor victory; Both countries signed a peace treaty later; Dutch retreated back to Malacca
Territorial changes	Re-establishment of Selangor Sultanate.

Belligerents
Selangor Sultanate; Pahang Kingdom	Dutch East India Company; Dutch Malacca; Dutch Batavia; Siak Sultanate

Commanders and leaders
Sultan Ibrahim Shah; Tun Abdul Majid	Dirk van Hogendorp; Pieter Gerardus de Bruijn; Raja Muhammad Ali

Strength
2,000	6 warships 326 cannons

Casualties and losses
Heavy	Heavy losses

The Dutch–Selangor war also known as Perang Satu Malam (One Night War), was a conflict over a fort in Bukit Malawati. The Dutch saw this as an opportunity to attack Selangor as a response to Selangor's raids on Dutch Malacca. This enraged Sultan Ibrahim of Selangor who was still governing the sultanate. Both countries signed a peace treaty, which later improved relations.

== Background ==
Following the Dutch takeover of Malacca in 1641, Sultan Ibrahim of Selangor began to see Dutch Malacca as a threat to Selangorian territory and began raiding the city. The Dutch reacted strongly to this and asked Dirk van Hogendorp to launch a full invasion against the Selangor. Sultan Ibrahim also sympathized with Johor in their war with the Dutch for attacking Dutch Malacca in 1783, where the Dutch almost lost.

== War ==
=== First phase (1784–1785) ===
On 13 July 1784, the Dutch commander Dirk van Hogendorp, with 11 warships and help from the army of the Siak Sultanate led by Raja Muhammad Ali, launched a full-scale attack on Kuala Selangor. The Dutch army shelled Kuala Selangor and fought Selangor soldiers coming from Sungai Selangor, and were fired upon by the cannons of Sultan Ibrahim's soldiers in the fort. The Selangor military was led by a warlord named Saiyid Jaafar.

After two weeks of fighting, the Dutch captured Kuala Selangor and, at the same time, captured the whole fortress of the Selangorian civilians. Sultan Ibrahim and his followers retreated to Pahang, where they were welcomed by Treasurer Abdul Majid. The Dutch also destroyed the fort and built a new one, naming it "Fort Altingsburg" for the Dutch governor-general and "Fort Utrecht" after a Dutch warship.

=== Second phase (1785–1786) ===
In Pahang, Sultan Ibrahim organized a yearlong strategy to recapture Bukit Malawati from the Dutch. Abd Majid prepared and donated equipment for war. In 1785, Sultan Ibrahim, with the people of Pahang, moved towards Bukit Malawati to attack and recapture it. On the night of 27 June 1785, a surprise attack was launched on Bukit Malawati. Sultan Ibrahim, known for being aggressive, in keeping with the Bugis identity, fought through the night. Weaponry used by Sultan Ibrahim's forces included daggers, spears, maces, and guns. Finally, the Dutch soldiers retreated and escaped by boat back to Malacca, and Sultan Ibrahim returned to the throne.

Following that, Dirk van Hogendorp once again went to Kuala Selangor with a larger force of 17 warships. A siege around the Selangor River was launched in July 1785. The price of rice and other necessities in Selangor rose due to the siege. The siege ended inclusively as many soldiers died due to fighting. After a year of fighting, a peace treaty was signed. It later improved relationships against both countries.

== Sources ==
- Fang, Dr Liaw Yock (August 1, 2011). Sejarah Kesusastraan Melayu Kelasik (in Malay). Yayasan Pustaka Obor Indonesia. ISBN 978-979-461-778-6.
- Lee, Kam Hing (1989). Peperangan Selangor-Belanda 1784-1786: sebab dan akibat dalam sejarah negeri Selangor: (The war between Selangor - Dutch 1784-1786) (in Malay).
