= Ibrahim Shah =

Ibrahim Shah may refer to

- Ibrahim Shah of Jaunpur
- Ibrahim Shah of Selangor
- Ibrahim Shah of Johor
