= Riau War =

1783–1784 war

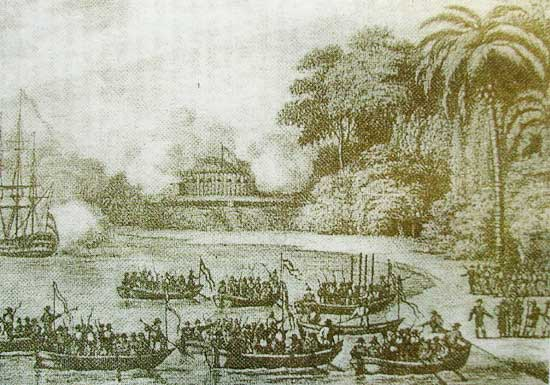
- Landing of VOC troops on Penyengat, 1783
Date	June 1783 – 31 October 1784
Location	Riau (Tanjungpinang) and Malacca 0°56′06″N 104°26′51″E
Result	VOC victory; VOC takes Riau

Belligerents
Dutch East India Company	Johor Sultanate; Riau; Selangor Sultanate; Rembau

Commanders and leaders
P. G. de Bruijn; Jacob Pieter van Braam; Arnoldus Lemker †	Raja Haji Fisabilillah †; Raja Ali; Ibrahim Shah of Selangor

Casualties and losses
Heavy, hundreds killed	Heavy

The Riau War took place in 1783–1784 and was fought between the Dutch East India Company (VOC) and several Malay states led by Riau. The war centered at the port of Riau (Tanjungpinang) and the main Dutch base at Malacca. Occurring during the Fourth Anglo-Dutch War, it was triggered by a dispute over the division of spoils from a seized British ship.

With incoming military reinforcements from Europe, the VOC became confident of its prospects and declared war. A blockade of Riau started in June 1784 and, after a months long blockade, the VOC attempted to seize Riau through the landing of marines. The assault was repelled following the destruction of a ship with heavy VOC losses and the loss of their commander. Forces from Riau and Selangor then besieged Malacca. Malacca's fall was prevented by the arrival of reinforcements in June 1784 and in ensuing fighting the Riau ruler Raja Haji Fisabilillah was killed.

After relieving Malacca, the VOC proceeded to seize Kuala Selangor and launched another attack on Riau. The war against Riau concluded in October following the surrender of its new ruler Raja Ali, while Selangor's ruler Ibrahim Shah continued to wage war against the VOC until 1786. Despite defeating Riau, the VOC lost much of its influence in the Strait of Malacca following the conflict, to the benefit of Britain and Siak.

== Background ==
Between 1760 and 1780, a balance of power existed between the two main powers in the Strait of Malacca: the Johor Sultanate and the Dutch East India Company (VOC). At Johor, Bugis warriors and merchants held significant influence in the court since the early eighteenth century due to their involvement in local power struggles, and the Bugis leader held the title of Yang di-Pertuan Muda (viceroy) following a 1722 pact with Johor's Sultan. The Bugis and VOC in the region had some conflicts, with Bugis leader Daeng Kemboja besieging Malacca in 1756–57. During this period, the Johor port of Riau (today Tanjungpinang in Indonesia's Riau Islands) developed into an entrepôt, which frequently traded with various Asian merchants and non-VOC European traders (mainly British merchants). This balance shifted following the outbreak of the Fourth Anglo-Dutch War in 1780. By December 1781, Dutch posts in Padang and Perak had been captured by the British, and the main Dutch trading post in the region Malacca appeared to be under threat.

In early 1782, Riau's ruler Yang di-Pertuan Muda Raja Haji Fisabilillah wrote an informal letter to the VOC proposing the seizure of the British merchant ship Betsy, which was situated in Riau's harbor and carried a cargo of opium worth up to over a million Dutch guilders (VOC's annual turnover, on average, was below 200 thousand). The VOC proceeded to launch an expedition and seized the ship and its cargo, however, they did not share any of the booty with Fisabilillah. Fisabilillah sent an envoy to Batavia to ask for a share of half the booty, but the request was denied. Fisabilillah again demanded a share in October 1782 by landing at Muar, a border town between Johor and Malacca with 300 ships, although nothing came of this. The VOC governor in Malacca, P. G. de Bruijn, saw Fisabilillah's behavior as intolerable (partly due to heated Dutch nationalism during the Anglo-Dutch war), and pressed for war.

== Course of the war ==
The main VOC authority in Batavia had been informed of an incoming fleet of warships from the Netherlands (initially scheduled for 1781, but delayed due to manpower issues) which they were to utilize "to the greatest possible use", and hence encouraged them towards conflict. In June 1783, a VOC squadron sailed into Riau's harbor, delivered a declaration of war, and commenced a blockade.

=== Fighting in Riau ===
The VOC blockade under the command of one Captain Toger Abo was not fully effective, as it lacked enough ships to fully blockade the island of Bintan. Furthermore, the defenses of Riau and the nearby island of Penyengat were too difficult to defeat with their available ships. They soon moved to a more distant blockade following the arrival of additional reinforcements, but still failed to force Riau's submission. Riau's defenders, for their part, launched assaults on small boats, which successfully forced the VOC squadron to withdraw for repairs twice. According to Malay chronicle Tuhfat al-Nafis, nighttime engagements between the boats and VOC cutters were "within shouting range". The Tuhfat further wrote that Bugis sailors fought on both sides and chatted in a friendly manner before engaging, while Dutch sailors cried out that "tomorrow we will have a good fight".

By October 1783, Abo had been replaced with the Vice-Governor of Malacca Arnoldus Lemker being appointed to lead the blockade. By this time, around 1,300 soldiers had joined the fleet, though a significant number had died from diseases. After further preparations, the Dutch launched an amphibious assault to land troops on the island on 6 January 1784. The VOC squadron sailed into the Riau harbor, but soon ran aground on stone banks that had been prepared by the defenders to repel landings. While most of the squadron managed to dislodge from the barrier, Lemker's flagship Malakka's Welvaaren remained stuck and soon came under fire from the defenders' positions. Lemker attempted to evacuate the troops aboard the ship, but the ship's powder keg was hit before the men could land. The ship exploded, killing Lemker along with hundreds of VOC troops. The Tuhfat gave the number of VOC deaths from the explosion as either 500 or 800.

Shortly after the loss of the Malakka's Welvaaren, the remaining VOC squadron lifted the blockade and returned to Malacca.

=== Siege of Malacca ===
On 14 January 1784, before the news of the failure of the Riau expedition reached Malacca, a group of soldiers from the Sultanate of Selangor (whose Sultan Ibrahim Shah was a nephew of Fisabilillah) and from Rembau had made landings near Malacca at Batang Tiga. The Selangoreans defeated a small force sent to repel them in a skirmish, and soon entrenched themselves. Ibrahim Shah also visited Riau, inviting Fisabilillah to join his siege of Malacca. By mid-February, the Riau forces under Fisabilillah had also landed at and seized Semabok to the east of Malacca, again entrenching themselves and defeating an attempt to repel them. A fortification was constructed by the attackers at Tanjung Tuan, and by mid-March the fortifications of Malacca were being assaulted. The Selangoreans and the Riau proceeded to seize Malacca's suburbs, blockading the city.

The situation in Malacca deteriorated for the VOC, who had been pushed to the main town and were forced to evacuate the European residents of Malacca's suburbs into the safety of the town walls. They dispatched messengers to nearby Malay states asking for reinforcements, receiving some from Muhammad Ali of Siak. In the middle of the siege, the fleet of warships from the Netherlands had arrived at Batavia under the command of Jacob Pieter van Braam, and was soon dispatched to Malacca. The fleet contained four first-rate ships, the first time they were deployed in the region, and carried 1,400 Europeans. On 18 June 1784, they made a landing and assaulted the Riau camp, triggering fierce fighting in which Fisabilillah was killed in action. The Tuhfat wrote that Fisabilillah died after ordering and joining an assault against the Dutch ranks, and that following his death the Dutch ceased their fire and allowed the Riau soldiers to leave unmolested. Following his death, Riau forces dispersed, lifting the siege.

=== Conclusion ===
With Malacca no longer under siege, the Rembau quickly settled for peace with the Dutch (who did not desire to launch an inland expedition). Van Braam's fleet soon proceeded to attack Selangor's capital at Kuala Selangor, forcing Ibrahim Shah to flee and allowing the VOC to seize the city. There, they installed Muhammad Ali of Siak as a puppet ruler. At Riau, Fisabilillah's nephew Raja Ali succeeded his position. The VOC then pushed for the Johor Sultan Badrul Alam Shah to break his pact with the Bugis rulers of Riau. He initially refused, leading to continued Riau-VOC fighting, culminating with an assault in late October by van Braam against a Riau fort at Penyengat. The fort was taken within a few days with heavy Riau losses, and Raja Ali departed Riau for Borneo on 31 October, a messenger bringing the news to the Dutch under a white flag.

== Aftermath ==
Johor's Sultan agreed to annul the 1722 agreement between Johor and the Bugis and banish the Bugis from Johor. Riau came under the suzerainty of VOC through Malacca, with a VOC garrison being established in Riau and a resident official being posted there. However, Dutch (and Johor) influence there did not last long, with a revolt in May 1787 causing Johor to relocate their court to nearby Lingga. Ibrahim Shah continued to wage war against the VOC, retaking Kuala Selangor in June 1785 and eventually settling for a peace treaty with the VOC in June 1786.

The damage suffered by Riau and Selangor reshaped trade in the region, benefitting trade centers previously overshadowed by them such as Siak, Penang (founded in 1786), and later Singapore. Many residents and merchants based from Riau relocated to other ports and islands such as Lingga and Pahang. Despite its victory, VOC was severely weakened in the region, to the extent that local pirates could launch an attack against a VOC post in 1787. Local rulers and traders, concerned with the Dutch conduct, began to turn to the British to counterbalance them. Dutch influence over the strait of Malacca continued to be eroded to the benefit of the British, until the Anglo-Dutch Treaty of 1824 formalized the transfer of the Malayan Peninsula to Britain's sphere of influence.

Fisabilillah's body was initially intended to be transported to Batavia, but the plans were shelved when the ship intended to transport it exploded. Instead, he was buried in Malacca, and was later moved and reburied at Penyengat during the British interregnum. He is today considered a National Hero of Indonesia.
