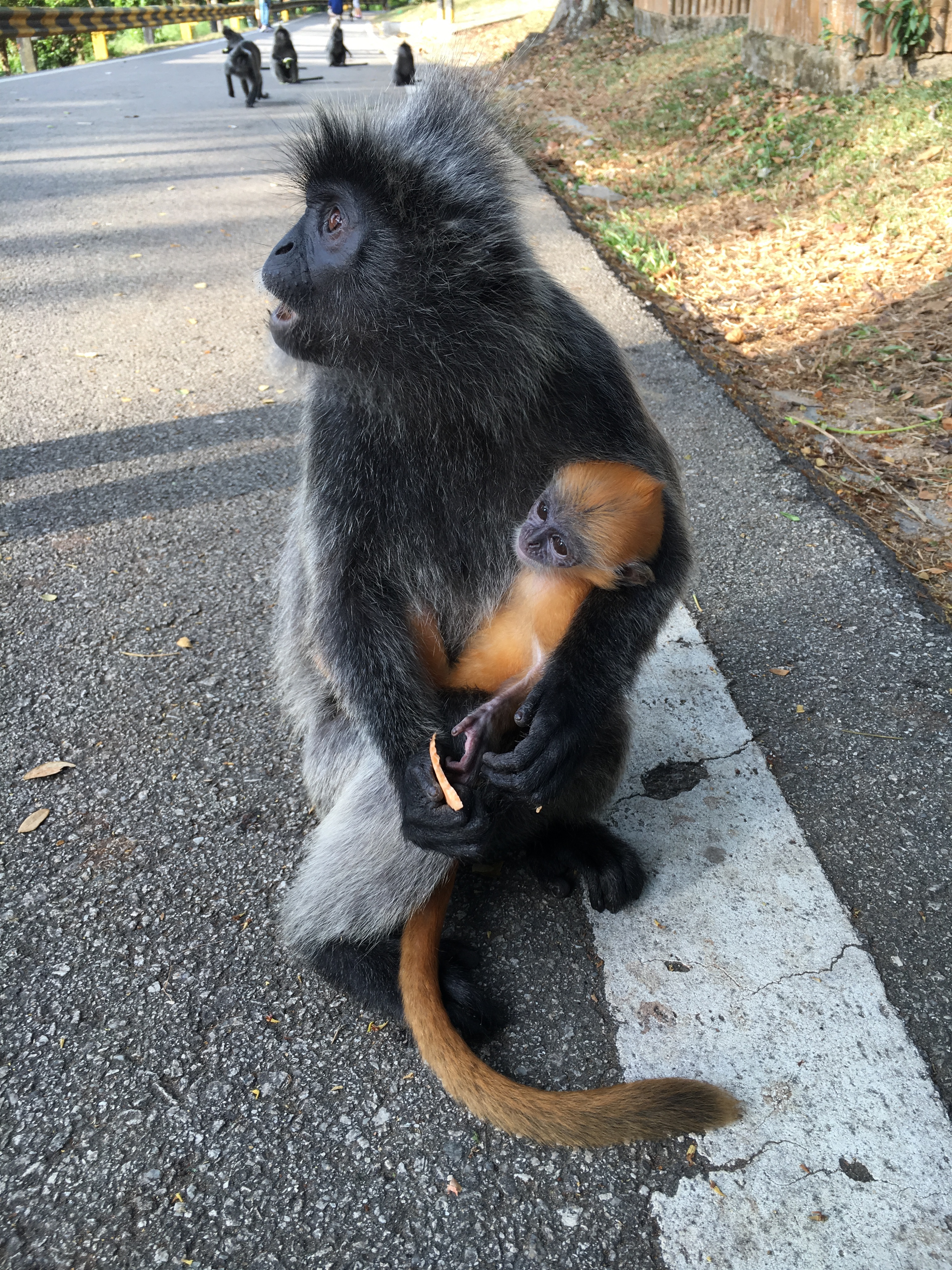
- Mother and baby at Bukit Melawati in Kuala Selangor, Malaysia

Conservation status
- Near Threatened (IUCN 3.1)

Scientific classification
- Kingdom: Animalia
- Phylum: Chordata
- Class: Mammalia
- Order: Primates
- Family: Cercopithecidae
- Genus: Trachypithecus
- Species group: Trachypithecus cristatus group
- Species: T. selangorensis

Binomial name
- Trachypithecus selangorensis Roos, Nadler & Walter, 2008
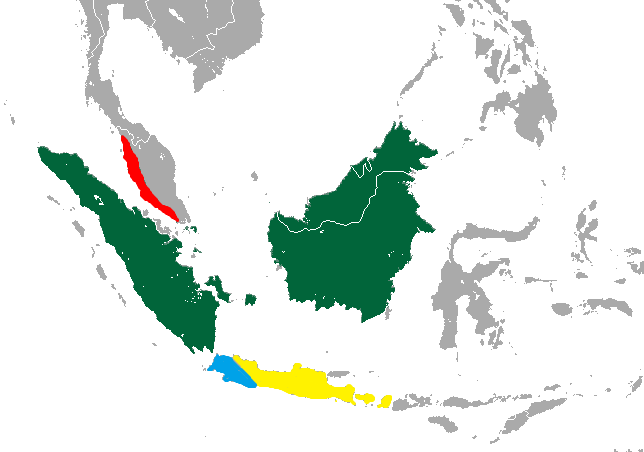
- Range shown in red

= Selangor silvered langur =

Species of Old World monkey

The Selangor silvered langur (Trachypithecus selangorensis) is a species of leaf monkey found on the west coast of Peninsular Malaysia. It had been previously considered a form of silvery lutung. Roos and colleagues elevated this population to a subspecies level, Trachypithecus cristatus selangorensis, in 2008. It has since come to be regarded by primatologists as a separate species, Trachypithecus selangorensis.

== Description ==
The Selangor silvered langur has a gray body with a black face and black feet and hands. The type specimen had a head and body length of 50.6 centimetres (19.9 in) and a tail that was 70.4 centimetres (27.7 in) long. The closely related silvery lutung has an average head and body length of 48.9 centimetres (19.3 in) for females and 54.4 centimetres (21.4 in) for males. The silvery lutung has an average weight of 5.7 kilograms (13 lb) for females and 6.6 kilograms (15 lb) for males. The Selangor silvered langur differs from the silvery lutung in the shape of its whiskers. The Selangor silvered langur has long, straight whiskers while the silvery lutung has mussel-shaped whiskers. The two species also differ genetically.

Infants are born with a very different color pattern than the adults. They have bright orange fur with white faces, hands and feet. The infant coloration transforms to the adult coloration over its first 3 to 5 months, starting with the head, hands and feet. All members of the group participate in the care of the infants, including females other than the mother and the dominant male. One theory for the reason for the orange infant coloration is that it may attract other females to help look after the infant.

== Distribution ==
This langur's distribution is restricted to the west coast of Peninsular Malaysia in Johor, Negeri Sembilan, Selangor, Melaka, Perak and Kedah. It is arboreal and prefers mangrove and riparian forests, but is also sometimes found on plantations. It eats mostly leaves, but also fruit, seeds, flowers and even dried wood. At Bukit Melawati, feeding the Selangor silvered langurs is a popular tourist activity. The Selangor silvered langurs at Bukit Malawati are among the few wild leaf monkey populations to have experienced continual habituation to humans. They will sometimes willingly touch and climb on visitors, in addition to approaching to beg for food.

== Behavior ==
Like most leaf monkeys, the Selangor silvered langur typically lives in groups with a single adult male and multiple adult females and their juvenile offspring. A study by Sterck and Van Hooff found that it was more likely than most to live in groups with more than one adult male. In some cases, a former dominant male was permitted to stay with the group after a younger male became dominant. In some cases, new young adult males were permitted to join the group without toppling the dominant male. In other cases younger males, presumably sons of the dominant male, were permitted to stay with the group for some time after reaching adulthood. More typically young males are ejected from the group by the dominant male upon reaching adulthood. Similarly aged males tend to leave their natal group together and join new groups together. Groups are territorial, with little overlap between the territories of different groups. A study by Lord Medway indicated that Selangor silvered langur infant births do not show a seasonal pattern

Besides feeding and caring for infants, the activity budget of Selangor silvered langurs includes playing, transportation, resting, vocalizing and grooming. Juveniles of both sexes participate in most of the playing and even infants that are only a few weeks old engage in play. Play can include wrestling and other play fighting and juvenile males are the most active participants in this type of play. A study by Bernstein at Bukit Melawati found that much play occurs on the ground and that whenever the group was on the ground and undisturbed the juveniles engaged in play. Monkeys of all ages, including infants and the dominant male, engage in grooming. Grooming sessions typically involve two monkeys but sometimes involve three or four. At times of distress the monkeys often embrace each other.

A study by Lee Harding observed that when Selangor silvered langurs encounter the smaller long-tailed macaques the langurs generally move away without fighting. On the other hand, Bernstein found that the two monkey species sometimes travel together and even feed in the same trees at times.

== Conservation status ==
A study by Khan published in 1978 suggested that the population in West Malaysia had declined from about 6,000 individuals to about 4,000 between 1958 and 1975.
