= Muhammad Shah of Selangor =

Sultan of Selangor (r. 1826–1857)

Muhammad محمد
- Sultan of Selangor
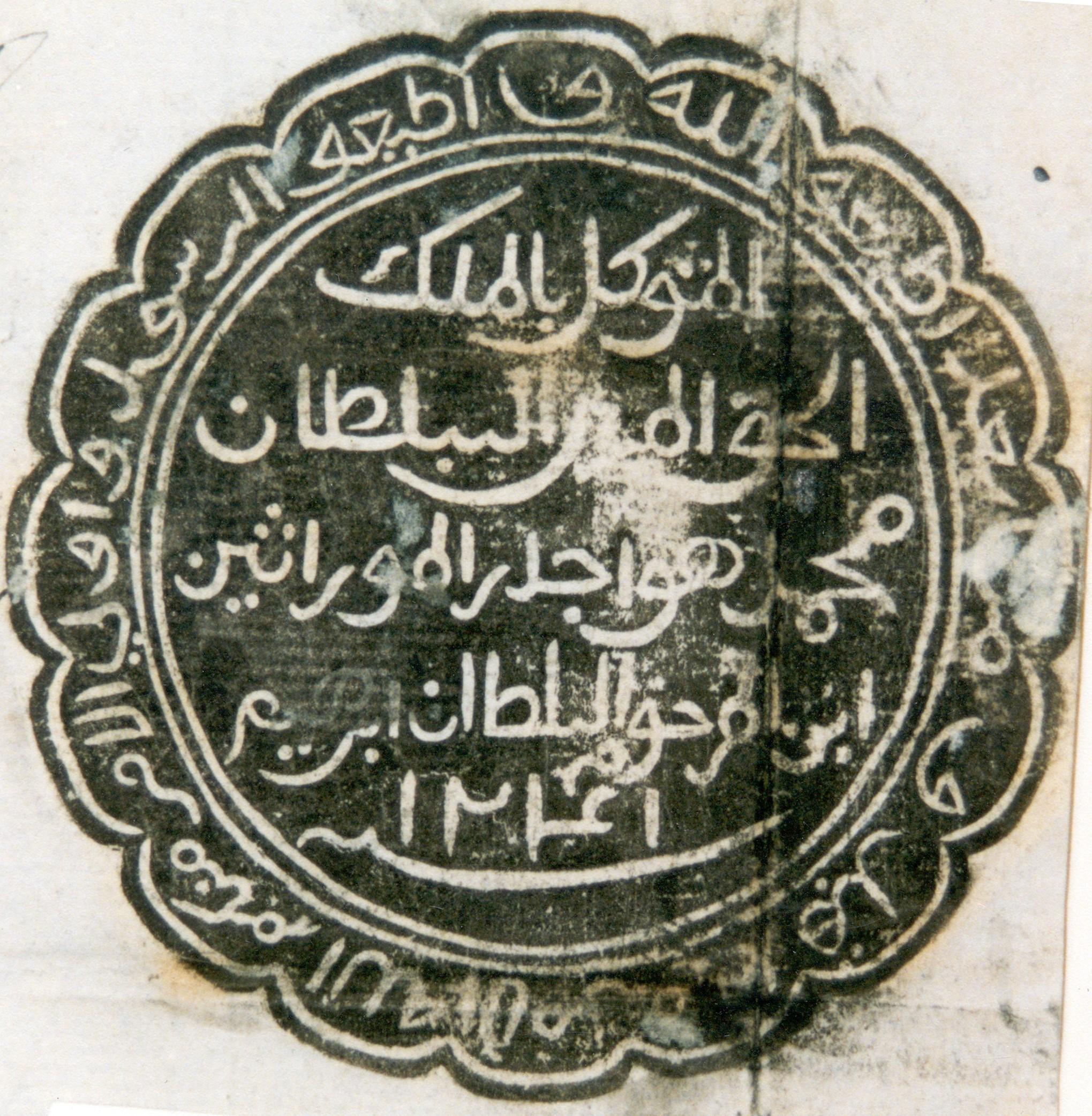
- This is the royal seal of Sultan Muhammad Shah, the Sultan of the state of Selangor.

3rd Sultan of Selangor
- Reign: 27 October 1826 – 6 January 1857
- Predecessor: Sultan Ibrahim Shah
- Successor: Abdul Samad
- Born: 1772
- Died: 6 January 1857 (aged 84-85)
- Burial: Bukit Melawati, Kuala Selangor
- Wives: Tengku Ampuan Raja Basik binti Arung To' Mojong; Raja Asiah binti Al-Marhum Sultan Ali 'Alauddin Shah of Riau
- Issue: Raja Sulaiman; Raja Mahmud; Raja Laut; Raja Abbas; Raja Abdul Jabbar; Raja Ibrahim; Raja Siti; Raja Saleha; Raja Lijah; Raja Auyah; Raja Senai; Raja Atfah; Raja Perbu
Names
- Raja Muhammad bin Raja Ibrahim
Regnal name
- Sultan Muhammad Shah ibni Almarhum Sultan Ibrahim Shah
- House: Opu Daeng Chelak
- Father: Sultan Ibrahim Shah ibni Almarhum Sultan Salehuddin Shah
- Mother: Cik Puan Besar Cik Long Halijah binti Dato' Hussain
- Religion: Sunni Islam

Muhammad Shah ibni Almarhum Sultan Ibrahim Shah (Jawi: سلطان محمد شاه ابن المرحوم سلطان إبراهيم شاه; born Raja Muhammad bin Raja Ibrahim; 1772 – 6 January 1857) was the third sultan of Selangor. His reign lasted 31 years until his death and saw the opening of tin mines in Ampang and the separation of Selangor into five independent districts. He gave land to his family eventually causing the Klang War.

== Reign ==
Muhammad Shah was not the son of his father's first wife, but since he was made the heir presumptive during his father's reign, Selangorean dignitaries accepted him as the next Sultan of Selangor. Sultan Muhammad Shah was not as competent in governing the state and did not have total control over local rajas, village leaders or their districts. By the end of his rule, Selangor had split into five individual territories, namely Bernam, Kuala Selangor, Kelang, Langat and Lukut. Each area was governed by different leaders and Muhammad Shah only controlled Kuala Selangor. Chinese settlers started mining for tin in the state during his reign. The setting up of tin mines in Ampang brought business to the people and has been recognised as his only success.

His initial giving of the Klang region to Raja Sulaiman (his son from a concubine) but then later cancelling the gift and then giving it to Raja Abdullah (his son in-law) would later cause resentment between the two parties and would lead to the Klang War between Raja Abdullah and Raja Mahadi (son of Raja Sulaiman).

== Family ==
He was the son of Sultan Ibrahim Shah by his wife, Cik Puan Besar Encik Long Halijah binti Dato' Hussain. He was the father-in-law of Abdul Samad, the 4th Sultan of Selangor who was married to Sultan Muhammad's daughter, Raja Atfah.

Regnal titles
Preceded by Ibrahim Shah	Sultan of Selangor; 27 October 1826 – 6 January 1857	Succeeded by Abdul Samad
