= Jacob Pieter van Braam =

Dutch States Navy officer (1737–1803)

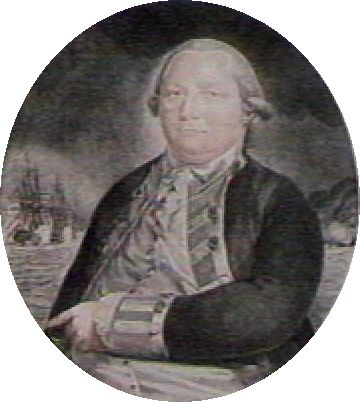
- Born: 27 October 1737; Werkhoven
- Died: 16 July 1803 (aged 65); Zwolle
- Occupation: Admiral

Jacob Pieter van Braam (Werkhoven, 27 October 1737 – Zwolle, 16 July 1803) was a Dutch States Navy officer. Van Braam joined the Admiralty of Amsterdam in 1748 as a midshipman. In 1751 he was captured by Barbary corsairs and would be a slave until 1753. On 25 February 1753 he was promoted to lieutenant and in 1758 to lieutenant-commander.

In 1764 he made the transition to the Dutch East India Company (VOC) where he was promoted to captain on 14 July 1766. From 1767 until 1773 he was provisions master in Bengal. In 1776 he temporarily left the VOC to become a Dutch post-captain; in 1782 he was in the rank of captain, commander of a regiment of marines under lieutenant admiral Willem van Wassenaar Spanbroek. In 1783 he was appointed commander of the VOC, commodore and member of the Council of the Indies (Raad van Indië; the governing council of the VOC colonial empire). From 1784 until 1786 he served as vlootvoogd (fleetguardian; admiral in charge of a fleet) in the Indian waters with four ships of the line and two frigates. In this function he was responsible for ending a siege of Malacca City by Riau troops and conquering Selangor during the Riau War.

In 1786 he returned to the Netherlands and once again joined the admiralty. On 12 June 1788 he was appointed schout-bij-nacht. On 10 May 1793 Van Braam was appointed vice admiral with the Admiralty of Amsterdam, and he retired on 27 February 1795.
