= Abdul Samad of Selangor =

Sultan of Selangor (r. 1857–1898)

Abdul Samad عبد الصمد
- Sultan of Selangor
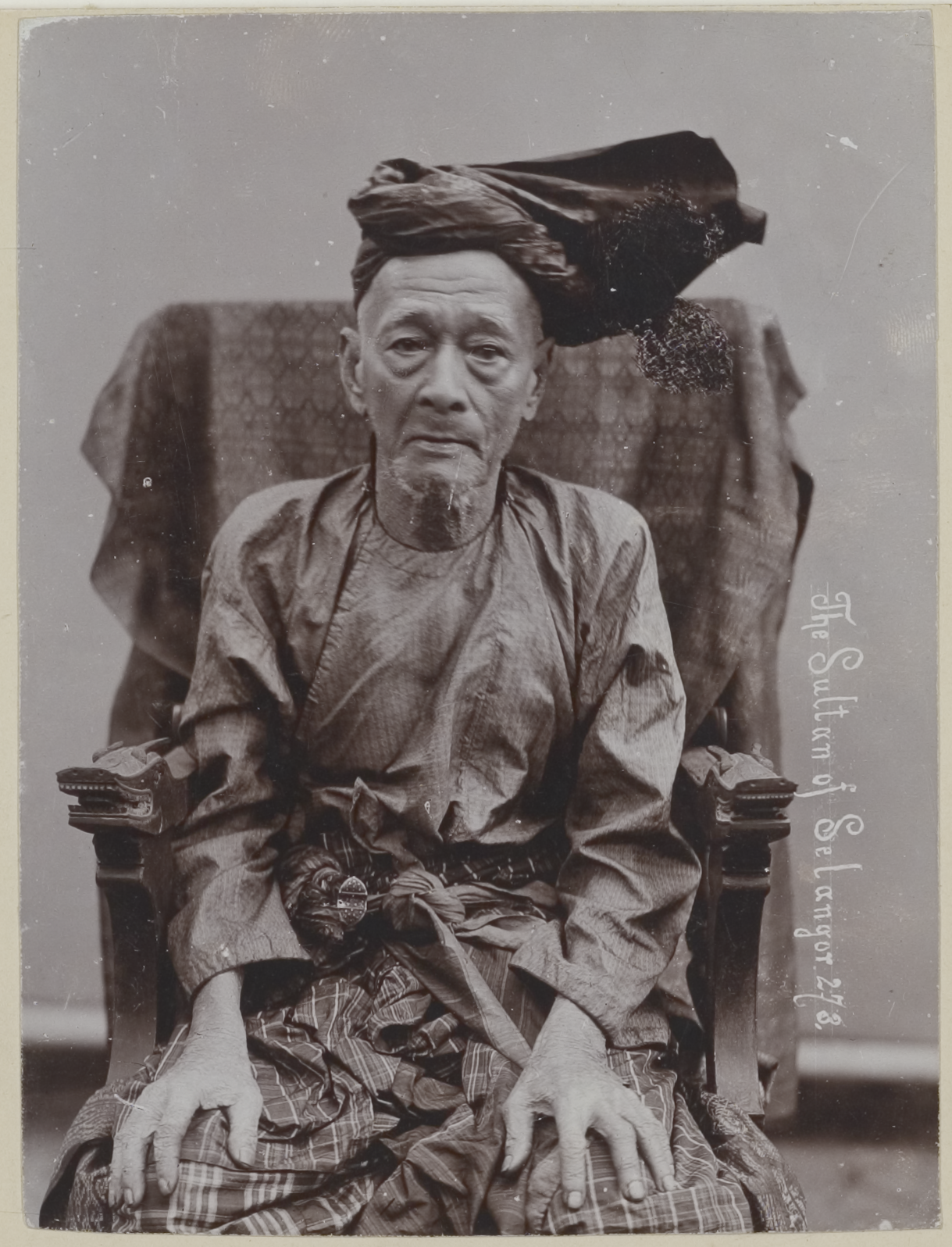
- The sultan in his eighties, c. 1890

4th Sultan of Selangor
- Reign: 6 January 1857 – 6 February 1898
- Predecessor: Muhammad Shah
- Successor: Alauddin Sulaiman Shah
- Born: 1804; Bukit Melawati, Selangor
- Died: 6 February 1898 (aged 93-94); Istana Bandar Temasha, Jugra, Selangor, FMS
- Burial: Makam Sultan Abdul Samad, Jugra, Banting, Selangor
- Wives: Che Puan of Selangor; Tengku Ampuan Raja Atfah Binti Al-Marhum Sultan Muhammad Shah; Che Fatimah binti Haji Abdul Ghani
- Issue: Raja Tipah; Raja Munah; Raja Muda Raja Musa; Raja Abu Nusah; Raja Arfah; Raja Yaakub; Raja Montel; Raja Nong Shah; Raja Mahmud; Raja Daud; Raja Abdul Kahar; Raja Alfah
Names
- Raja Abdul Samad bin Raja Abdullah
Regnal name
- Sultan Abdul Samad ibni Almarhum Raja Bendahara Abdullah, KCMG
Posthumous name
- Marhum Jugra
- House: Opu Daeng Chelak
- Father: Raja Bendahara Abdullah Ibni Almarhum Sultan Ibrahim Shah
- Mother: Che Lipah
- Religion: Sunni Islam

Abdul Samad ibni Almarhum Raja Bendahara Abdullah KCMG (Jawi: سلطان عبد الصمد ابن المرحوم راج عبد الله; born Raja Abdul Samad bin Raja Abdullah, 1804 – 6 February 1898) was the fourth Sultan of Selangor.

Raja Abdul Samad was born in 1804 at Bukit Melawati in Selangor to Raja Abdullah, the younger brother of Sultan Muhammad Shah of Selangor. He reigned for 41 years from 1857 until his death in 1898. His time on the throne saw the only civil war in Selangor, the establishment of Kuala Lumpur, the introduction of the flag and coat of arms of Selangor and the start of British involvement in Selangor state affairs.

== Rise to the throne ==
A struggle for power occurred towards the end of Sultan Muhammad Shah of Selangor's reign. His nephew, Raja Abdul Samad strengthened his position by marrying Muhammad's daughter, Raja Atfah in 1844 and was then made chief of the Selangor valley. During the 1850s, writings by Frank Swettenham mentioned that Abdul Samad murdered numerous men, and this was not refuted by Abdul Samad.

Before becoming the Sultan of Selangor, Abdul Samad held the title of Tengku Panglima Raja and held authority over Langat. Sultan Muhammad Shah, died on 6 January 1857 without appointing an heir. This started a dispute between the royal court and dignitaries of Selangor to choose the next sultan. Malay customs dictated that in choosing the next sultan the son of a royal wife takes precedence over the sons of other wives. This made Raja Mahmud the next legitimate heir but he was too young and was unable to rule. Sultan Muhammad's older and more competent sons, Raja Laut and Raja Sulaiman were sons of concubines, the Sultan's sons-in-law, Raja Jumaat and Raja Abdullah, were from the Riau branch of the family, hence they were all ineligible. This left Raja Abdul Samad as the strongest candidate. Raja Jumaat and Raja Abdullah became convinced that they could become the power behind the throne if they supported Raja Abdul Samad to take the throne. With their patronage and the support of four other state dignitaries, a consensus was select Raja Abdul Samad as the sultan.

Other sources state that Selangor went on for two years without a sultan until he was favoured and that, unlike his predecessors, he was not formally installed by the Sultan of Perak.

== Reign ==
Following the successful establishment of the Ampang tin mines by Muhamad Shah, Sultan Abdul Samad used the tin ore to trade with the Straits Settlements. The mines in turn attracted even more Chinese miners with the help of Raja Abdullah bin Raja Jaafar, one of his sons-in-law and Yap Ah Loy, a Chinese Kapitan.

In 1866, the Sultan gave Raja Abdullah the power and authority over Klang. This fueled the feud between Raja Abdullah and Raja Mahadi, who was the previous administrator of Klang. The dispute led to the Klang War. The Sultan appointed his son-in-law, Tengku Dhiauddin Zainal Rashid (a.k.a. Tengku Kudin), as vice yamtuan and arbitrator twice during the war; first on 26 June 1868 and again on 22 July 1871. At the same time he handed over management of the entire state. He also provided Langat to Tengku Kudin to help him fund the handling of the war. Tengku Kudin in turn engaged the help of Pahang, mercenaries and Sir Andrew Clarke of the British Empire. This marked the first British involvement in local politics. The Sultan later handed over the ruling power of Klang to Tungku Kudin after the war was won in 1874. In 1878 Tengku Kudin stepped down from this post.

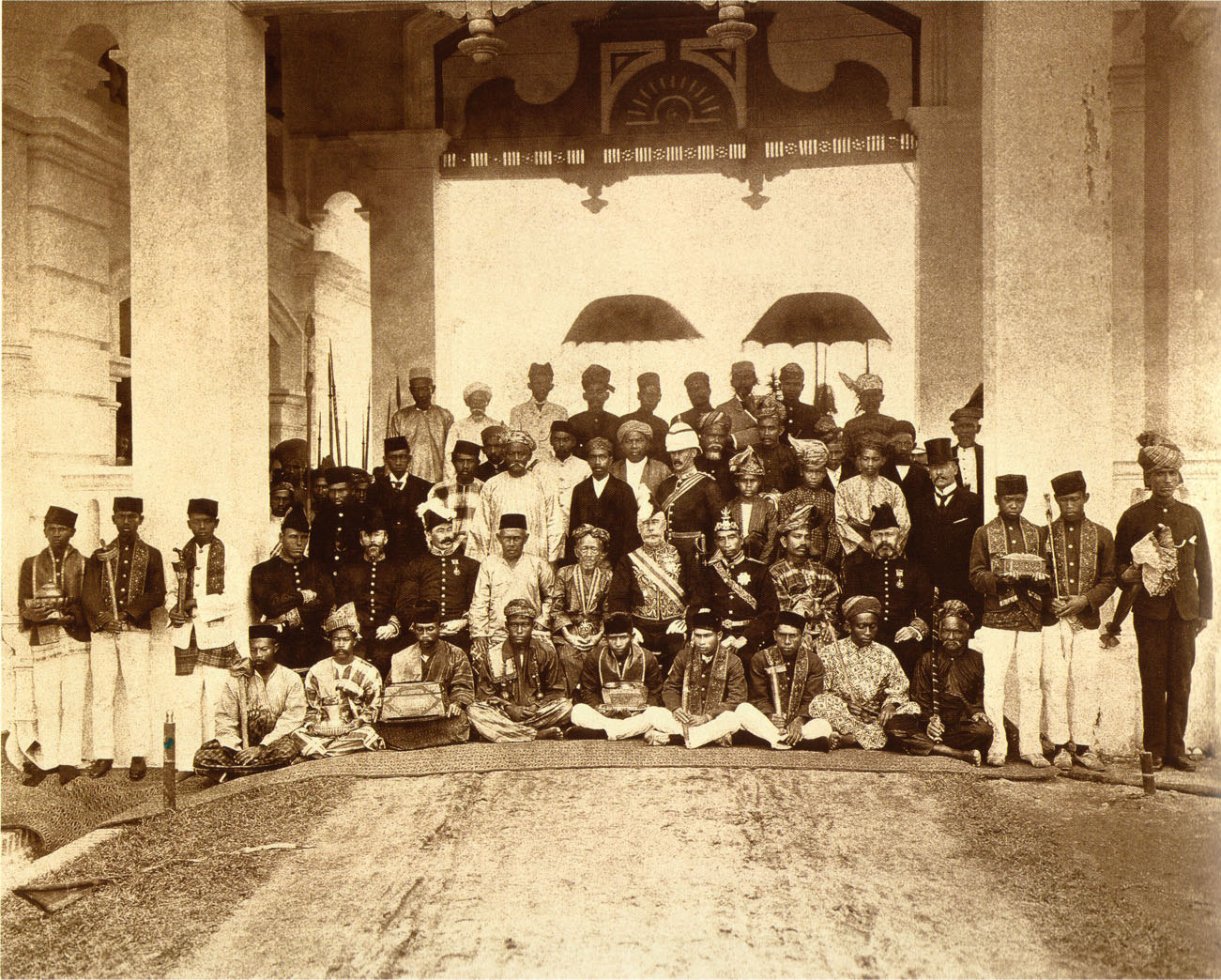
Sultan Abdul Samad attended the First Malay Rulers Durbar held in Kuala Kangsar in 1897.

After a number of pirate attacks in Selangor, Andrew Clarke assigned Frank Swettenham as a live-in advisor to Sultan Abdul Samad in August 1874. Sultan Abdul Samad accepted James Guthrie Davidson as the first British Resident of Selangor in 1875. In October of the same year, Sultan Abdul Samad sent a letter to Andrew Clarke requesting for Selangor to be made a British protectorate.

During his reign, the areas of Semenyih, Beranang and Broga came under Selangorean jurisdiction. Lukut however was handed to Dato' Kelana of Sungai Ujong on 30 July 1880. The Sultan was awarded the Order of St Michael and St George (KCMG) conferring the title Sir. Jugra became the royal capital of Selangor when Sultan Abdul Samad built the Jugra Palace and moved there in 1875. The state capital was moved from Klang to Kuala Lumpur in 1880.

In 1893, he along with Kapitan Yap Kwan Seng, K. Thamboosamy and Loke Yew helped found the Victoria Institution in Kuala Lumpur. Sultan Abdul Samad was made one of the first two patrons of the school.

Sultan Abdul Samad was a member of the Council of Rulers of the Federated Malay States, under the British colonial regime. The sultans of the four Federated Malay States of Perak, Selangor, Negeri Sembilan, and Pahang were represented at the first durbar, which convened in 1897 at Kuala Kangsar, Perak.

Sultan Abdul Samad interacted openly with his people as observers noted that he mingled by chatting in local markets, while taking his daily walks or while watching cockfights.

== Death ==
Sultan Abdul Samad died on 6 February 1898 at the age of 93 after reigning for 41 years. He was buried in the Sultan Abdul Samad Mausoleum in Bukit Jugra. He had 12 children, 6 sons and 6 daughters from two wives. Raja Muda Raja Musa, the heir apparent, died in 1884. Hence next in line was Raja Muda Raja Musa's eldest son, Raja Sulaiman Shah.

== Legacy ==
The Sultan Abdul Samad Building and Sultan Abdul Samad Jamek Mosque in Kuala Lumpur, Sultan Abdul Samad Secondary School in Petaling Jaya, Sultan Abdul Samad Mosque in Kuala Lumpur International Airport (KLIA) and the Sultan Abdul Samad Library in Universiti Putra Malaysia are named after him.

Regnal titles
Preceded by Muhammad Shah	Sultan of Selangor; 1859 - 6 February 1898	Succeeded by Sulaiman Musa
