= Bukit Malawati =

Historic hillfort in Malaysia

- Location within Malaysia

Highest point
- Coordinates: 3°20′31″N 101°14′46″E

Naming
- English translation: Malawati Hill
- Language of name: Malay

Geography
- Location: Kuala Selangor District, Selangor

Geology
- Mountain type: Inselberg

Bukit Malawati (Malawati Hill in English) is a fort located in Kuala Selangor, Selangor, Malaysia. Managed by the Kuala Selangor Municipal Council, Bukit Malawati is a popular local tourist attraction. It has strategic importance because of its position at the mouth of the Selangor River which drains into the Strait of Malacca, with vantages on both the Strait and Sumatra, Indonesia. Some of Bukit Malawati's historical highlights include an old lighthouse, as well as the remains of Kota Malawati (Malay for Fort Malawati). Bukit Malawati also serves as the final resting place for three of Selangor's earliest Sultans.

== History ==
The fort was first constructed by local Malays in the early 16th century at the behest of Tun Mahmud Shah of Malacca. Towards the end of the 17th century, Bugis settlers began to establish themselves on the west coast of the Malay Peninsula and installed Raja Lumu as the first Sultan of Selangor in 1742, who styled himself as Sultan Salehuddin Shah. Sultan Ibrahim Shah, who succeeded Raja Lumu in 1778, had the fort further fortified as a precautionary measure in order to defend against possible Dutch invasions.

Despite this, Kuala Selangor fell to Dutch troops when they stormed the fort in 1784. Led by Dirk van Hogendorp, the fierce campaign was mounted as a reprisal to the series of assaults waged by Sultan Ibrahim's ally, Raja Haji Fisabilillah, against A Famosa in Malacca, which was a Dutch stronghold at the time. Although Raja Haji was killed during the battle, the Dutch wanted retribution from Sultan Ibrahim Shah for providing him with naval support. The Dutch East India Company (VOC) then dispatched their fleet of vessels to Kuala Selangor to attack Sultan Ibrahim Shah. The advancing van Hogendorp's VOC armada battered the fort from the sea with their cannons for two weeks, driving the sultan's forces into the nearby jungles. Sultan Ibrahim Shah himself fled to Bernam, and subsequently to Pahang. Following his flight, the Dutch captured the fort and renamed it Fort Altingburg in honour of Willem Arnold Alting, the Governor-General of the Dutch East Indies from 1780 to 1797.

Sultan Ibrahim later returned to recapture the fort in 1785 with the aid of his brother, Dato' Penggawa Permatang Mahabijaya (Penggawa Tua), and Bendahara Adb. The fort was eventually destroyed during the Selangor Civil War in the 19th century.

== Features ==
Bukit Malawati is located near other tourist attractions, such as Kampung Kuantan Firefly Park and Kuala Selangor Nature Park. Some of the popular attractions at the hillfort also include a tram ride, a royal mausoleum, and a museum.

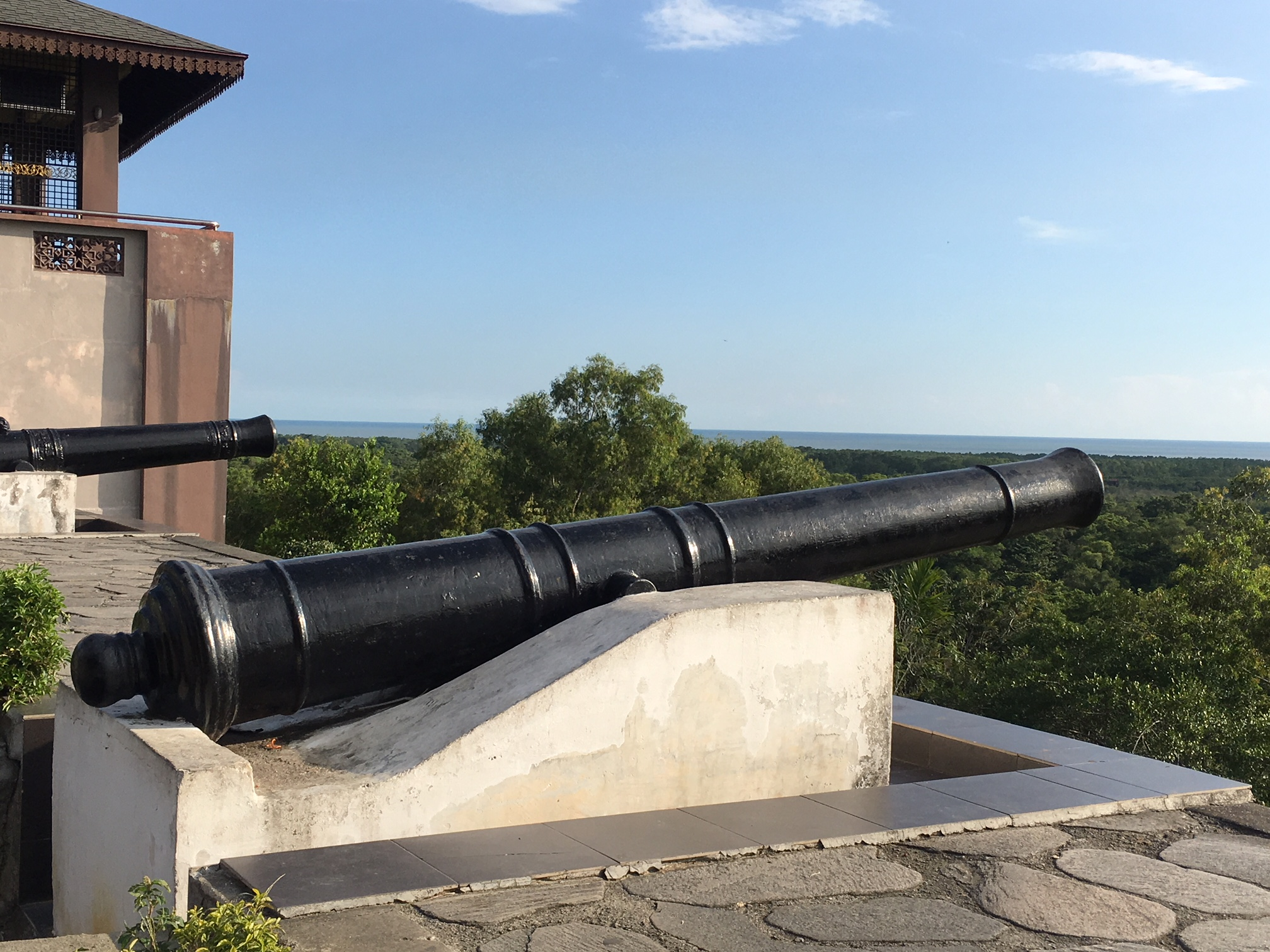
Cannons fortifying Bukit Malawati

=== Rumah Api Kuala Selangor (Kuala Selangor Lighthouse) ===
Also known as the Altingsburgh Lighthouse, the structure was originally built by the Dutch in 1794. It was extensively refurbished by the British in 1907 before it was officially reopened in 1910. The fully functional lighthouse is now considered to be one of Bukit Malawati's defining features. Measuring at 83 metres from seabed and 27 metres from land, the lighthouse presently operates on electricity. It rotates and projects an intense beam of light that is visible up to 56 kilometres twice every 15 seconds.

=== Batu Hampar (The Bedrock) ===
Measuring at 5x5x1 square feet, Batu Hampar is a large rock slab that was placed in the west of the courtyard. The bedrock was reportedly used for the purpose of executions, where traitors of the Sultan would be laid by their executioners for beheading. According to a local legend, the fourth Sultan of Selangor, Sultan Abdul Samad, would spend his evenings ruminating on the slab while watching the sunset.

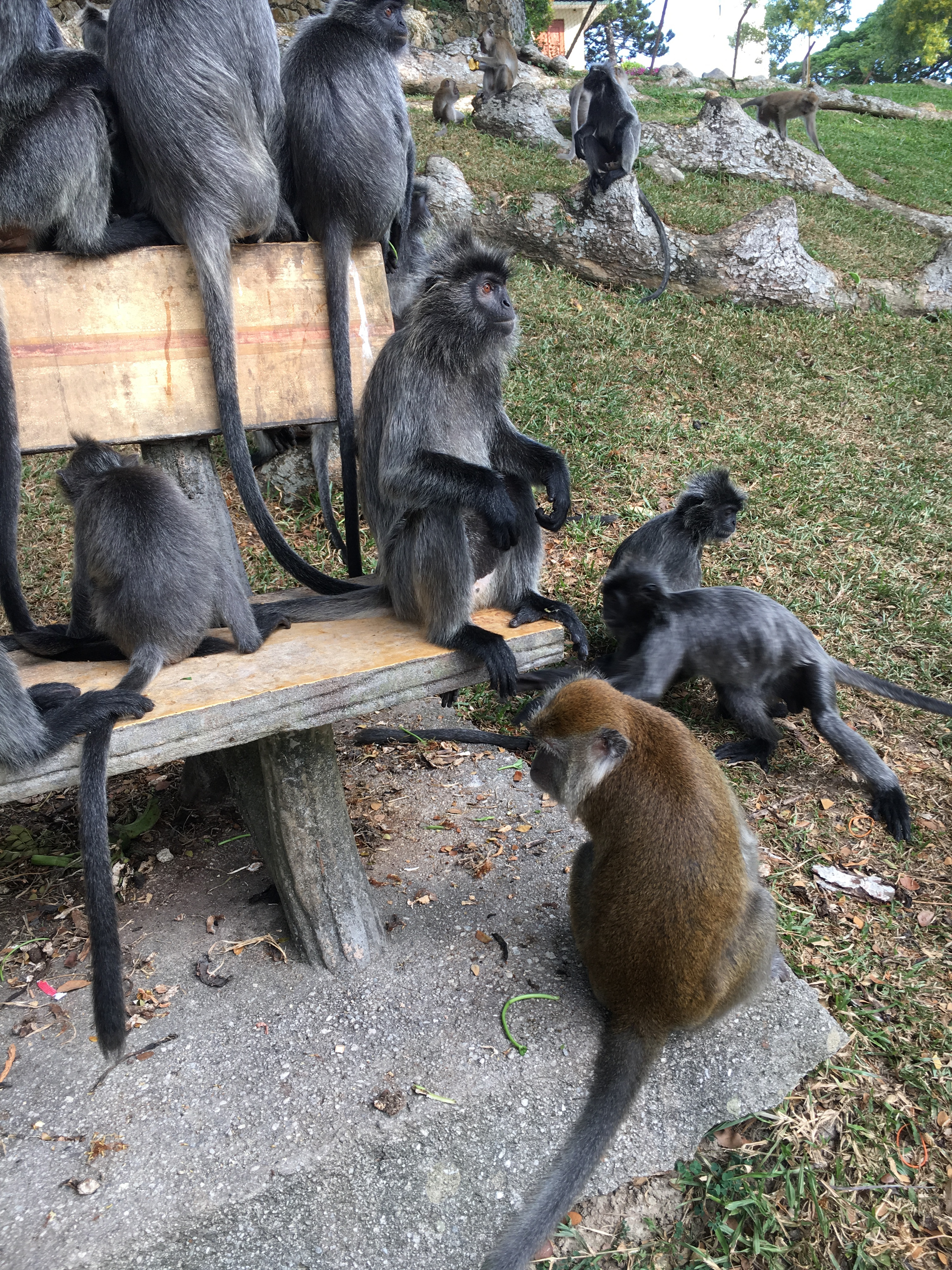
Silvered leaf monkeys and a long-tailed macaque at Bukit Malawati

=== Kota Malawati (Malawati Fort) ===
Cannons reinforced the ring of fortifications that encircled the fort, which was constructed by local villagers during the rule of the second Sultan of Selangor, Sultan Ibrahim Shah, in the 18th century.

=== Kuala Selangor Historical Museum ===
Not too far from the lighthouse, the local museum houses arrays of ancient weapons, dioramas, specimens of old currencies, and other collections of relics and artifacts. Visitors can learn about Kuala Selangor's local history, including its early settlement, fishing culture, and trading history from the exhibits.

=== Perigi Beracun (Poisoned Well) ===
Local history claimed that the Poisoned Well was used to torture traitors. Offenders would be placed inside the well, which would be filled with a watery solution mixed with irritants, such as latex and bamboo shoots, up to chin-level as punishment. Today, curious visitors may view the well at close range, which has been covered with iron grates for health and safety to prevent unwanted mishaps.

=== Royal Mausoleum ===
The Royal Mausoleum (Malay: Makam Diraja Bukit Melawati) serves as the burial ground for the first three Sultans of Selangor – Sultan Salehuddin Shah, Sultan Ibrahim Shah, and Sultan Muhammad Shah, as well as their wives. The site is closed to the general public.

== List of graves ==
=== Sultan graves ===
- Sultan Salehuddin Shah ibni Almarhum Raja Daeng Cherlak - the first Sultan of Selangor (died:1778)
- Sultan Ibrahim Shah ibni Almarhum Sultan Salehuddin Shah - (died:27 October 1826)
- Sultan Muhammad Shah ibni Almarhum Sultan Ibrahim Shah - (6 January 1857)

==== Tengku Ampuan/Pemaisuri graves (Graves of Royal Consorts) ====
- Che' Puan Besar Long Jalijah binti Dato' Husain -The first ever Che' Puan Besar of Selangor 1771 - ?
- Tengku Ampuan Tengah binti Raja Haji-The first Tengku Ampuan of Selangor 1796 - 27 October 1826
- Tengku Ampuan Basik binti Arung To' Mojong- Tengku Ampuan of Selangor ? - 6 January 1857
- Tengku Ampuan Raja Aftah Binti Al-Marhum Sultan Muhammad Shah -Tengku Ampuan of Selangor 1844 - 1873

=== Royal family graves ===
- Raja Haji Nyallar Shah ibni Almarhum Sultan Haji Salehhuddin Shah - (Raja Muda) (died; 18ee)
- Raja Hajjah Pyunnuh binti Almarhum Sultan Haji Sallehhuddin Shah - (died; 18ee)
- Raja Hajjah Pherrak binti Almarhum Sultan Haji Sallehhuddin Shah - (died; 18ee)
- Raja Hajjah Sharifah binti Almarhum Sultan Haji Haji Sallehhuddin Shah - (died; 18ee)

- Raja Haji Ismail Shah I ibni Almarhum Sultan Haji Ibrahim Shah I - (Raja Bendahara) (died; 18ee)
- Raja Haji Abbu Shaidd Shah ibni Almarhum Sultan Haji Ibrahim Shah I - (Raja Panglima Besar) I (died; 18ee)
- Raja Haji Abdullah Shah ibni Almarhum Sultan Haji Ibrahim Shah I - (Raja Panglima Besar) II (died; 18ee)
- Raja Haji Ahmadd Shah I ibni Almarhum Sultan Haji Ibrahim Shah I - (Raja Panglima Perang) II (died; 18ee)
- Raja Haji Hassan Shah ibni Almarhum Sultan Haji Ibrahim Shah I - (Raja Panglima Perang) I (died; 18ee)
- Raja Haji Hussin Shah ibni Almarhum Sultan Haji Ibrahim Shah I - (Raja Bendahara) (died; 18ee)
- Raja Haji Abdul Rahman Shah ibni Almarhum Sultan Haji Ibrahim Shah I -(Raja Temenggung) (died; 18ee)
- Raja Haji Hanjjii Jabbar Shah ibni Almarhum Sultan Haji Ibrahim Shah I - (died; 18ee)
- Raja Haji Yussuf Jhabbar Shah ibni Almarhum Sultan Haji Ibrahim Shah I - (died; 18ee)
- Raja Haji Abbas Jhabbar Shah I ibni Almarhum Sultan Haji Ibrahim Shah I - (died; 18ee)
- Raja Haji Salleh Shah ibni Almarhum Sultan Haji Ibrahim Shah I - (died; 18ee)
- Raja Hajjah Fattimmah binti Almarhum Sultan Haji Ibrahim Shah I - (died; 18ee)
- Raja Hajjah Sannyie binti Almarhum Sultan Haji Ibrahim Shah I - (died; 18ee)
- Raja Hajjah Ammyinnah binti Almarhum Sultan Haji Ibrahim Shah I - (died; 18ee)
- Raja Hajjah Aissyahh binti Almarhum Sultan Haji Ibrahim Shah I - (died; 18ee)
- Raja Hajjah Marryiamm binti Almarhum Sultan Haji Ibrahim Shah I - (died; 18ee)
- Raja Hajjah Maimunnah binti Almarhum Sultan Haji Ibrahim Shah I - (died; 18ee)
- Raja Hajjah Kaddijjah binti Almarhum Sultan Haji Ibrahim Shah I - (died; 18ee)
- Raja Hajjah Hallijjah binti Almarhum Sultan Haji Ibrahim Shah I - (died; 18ee)
- Raja Hajjah Hammiddah binti Almarhum Sultan Haji Ibrahim Shah I - (died; 18ee)

- Raja Haji Alaeddin Sulaiman Shah I ibni Almarhum Sultan Haji Muhammad Shah - (Raja Muda) (died; 1818)
- Raja Haji Mahmudd Jhabbar Shah ibni Almarhum Sultan Haji Muhammad Shah - (Raja Muda) (died; 18ss)
- Raja Haji Lhautt Jhabbar Shah ibni Almarhum Sultan HajiMuhammad Shah - (Raja Muda) (died; 18sss)
- Raja Haji Abdul Jhabbar Shah ibni Almarhum Sultan Muhammad Shah - (died; 18ee)
- Raja Haji Abbhas Jhabbar Shah II ibni Almarhum Sultan Haji Muhammad Shah - (died; 18ee)
- Raja Haji Ibrahim Shah II ibni Almarhum Sultan Haji Muhammad Shah - (died; 18ee)
- Raja Hajjah Shitti binti Almarhum Sultan Haji Muhammad Shah - (died; 18ee)
- Raja Hajjah Saleha binti Almarhum Sultan Haji Muhammad Shah - (died; 18ee)
- Raja Hajjah Linjah binti Almarhum Sultan Haji Muhammad Shah - (died; 18ee)
- Raja Hajjah Auyyah binti Almarhum Sultan Haji Muhammad Shah - (died; 18ee)
- Raja Hajjah Sennai binti Almarhum Sultan Haji Muhammad Shah - (died; 18ee)
- Raja Hajjah Alfhah binti Almarhum Sultan Haji Muhammad Shah - (died; 18ee)
- Raja Hajjah Perduh binti Almarhum Sultan Haji Muhammad Shah - (died; 18ee)

== Fauna ==
Bukit Malawati is home to the local silvered leaf monkeys and long-tailed macaques. The silvered leaf monkeys at Bukit Malawati are accustomed to human presence, and are sometimes bold enough to approach visitors. Tourists are discouraged from feeding the monkeys.
