= Flag and coat of arms of Selangor =

Symbols of the Malaysian state

The flag and emblem of Selangor are state symbols of Selangor, Malaysia. These two symbols are distinct from each other in style. Similar to other states of Malaysia with Malay royalties, both the flag and arms of Selangor are influenced by royalties, Islam, and political symbols of the state.

== Flag ==
Selangor
- Use: Civil and state flag
- Proportion: 1:2
- Adopted: 1875 (original); 1965 (modified)
- Design: Quarterly red and yellow, with white crescent and five-pointed star in the canton

The flag of Selangor consists of four proportionally-sized sections. The upper hoist and lower fly sections are red, while the upper fly and lower hoist sections are yellow. The red sections symbolise bravery. The yellow sections refer to royalty, represented by the local monarchy of Selangor, and the Sultan, who is the head of the state. The official religion of Selangor is Islam, and that is denoted by the white crescent and star in the upper hoist corner of the flag. This flag has an official ratio of 1:2, although the flag is also manufactured in 2:3 proportions with 4x6 and 6x9 foot flags being common.

The flag's design has been in use by the state government with few changes decades before Malaya's independence, the only noticeable differences of earlier iterations being the use of yellow instead of white for the crescent and star. The flag was introduced by the 2nd British Resident, J. G. Davidson, and approved by the Colonial Secretary's Office of the Straits Settlements on 16th August 1875. It was used as the state flag and ensign, flown at the Resident's residence, government buildings (including police stations), and aboard government ships. A variation of the Selangor state flag was used as the Resident's flag, but this version featured the Union Jack in the canton instead of the star and crescent. The current flag design was officially adopted on 30th January 1965.

Flags of Selangor
Selangor's first flag in the 1780s

Flag of Selangor
16 Aug. 1875 – 30 Jan. 1965

Standard of the Sultan

=== City, district and municipal council flags ===
While Selangor has not followed the practice of Kelantan, Terengganu and Johor in assigning flags for its cities, districts and municipal areas, some local government authorities in the state have adopted their own emblems and flags.

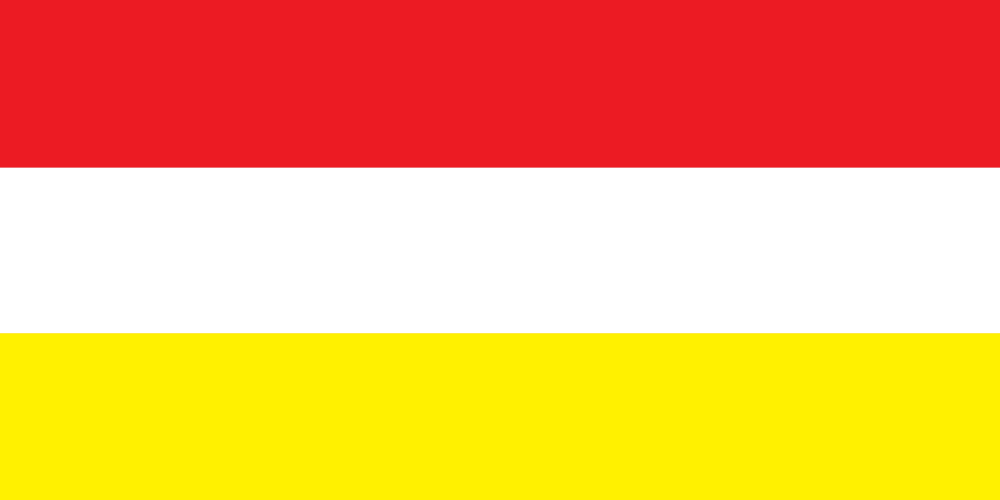
Flag of Sabak Bernam District Council

== Emblem ==
State emblem of Selangor
- Motto: Dipelihara Allah (دڤليهارا الله) "Under the Protection of Allah" in Red Jawi Script; Selangor (سلاڠور) in both Rumi and Yellow Jawi Script

The emblem of Selangor is a symbol of the state; it cannot properly be called a coat of arms as it does not conform to heraldic traditions. It is an amalgam of items that represent courage and royalty. The crescent moon and star in the centre represent Islam. The red spear (tombak) in the centre is called the Sambu Warna. The emblem is supported by a short kris (keris pendek) on the right and a long kris (keris panjang) on the left. These weapons constitute the royal regalia of the state. The motto of the state is written in the Jawi script in red, and it reads Dipelihara Allah or "Under the Protection of Allah". A broad belt (tali bengkung) appears underneath the motto. It was worn by local warriors of the past to secure their waistcloth. The emblem was designed and first illustrated by the fifth Sultan of Selangor, Sultan Alauddin Sulaiman Shah.

=== City, district and municipal council emblems ===
All 12 local governments in Selangor have their own emblem, which evolved in design throughout history. Each design may reflect a municipality's identities and or the roles and responsibilities of its local authority. Five local authorities – the Municipal Councils of Ampang Jaya, Hulu Selangor, Kajang and Selayang and the Sabak Bernam District Council incorporated the State Emblem into their own emblems. Another local authority – Klang Municipal Council previously adopted a Coat of arms with the State Emblem as its crest. However, it was replaced by a new emblem when the Municipal Council was upgraded as the Klang Royal City Council.

Emblem of Shah Alam City Council

Emblem of Petaling Jaya City Council
