= Salehuddin of Selangor =

Sultan of Selangor (r. 1766–1782)

Salehuddin صالح الدين
- Sultan of Selangor

1st Sultan of Selangor
- Reign: 1766–1782
- Predecessor: Position Established
- Successor: Ibrahim Shah

Yang Di-Pertuan Besar of Selangor
- Reign: 1743–1766

Personal Details
- Born: 1705
- Died: 1782 (aged 76–77)
- Burial: Royal Cemetery, Bukit Melawati, Kuala Selangor
- Spouse: Engku Puan binti Paduka Sri Sultan Alauddin Ri'ayat Shah of Riau
- Issue: Raja Ibrahim Shah; Raja Nala; Raja Punuh; Raja Perak; Raja Sharifah
Names
- Raja Lumu bin Almarhum Opu Daeng Chelak
Regnal name
- Sultan Salehuddin Shah Ibni Almarhum Yamtuan Muda Riau II Opu Daeng Chelak
Posthumous name
- Marhum Saleh
- House: Opu Daeng Chelak
- Father: Yamtuan Muda Riau II Opu Daeng Chelak bin Almarhum Opu Daeng Rilaga
- Mother: Encik Tomita
- Religion: Sunni Islam

Salehuddin Shah ibni Almarhum Yamtuan Muda Riau II Opu Daeng Chelak (Jawi: سلطان صالح الدين شاه ابن المرحوم يمتوان مودا رياو ٢ اوڤو داءيڠ چلق; born Raja Lumu bin Opu Daeng Chelak, 1705–1782) was the first Sultan of Selangor. He was the son of the Bugis warrior prince Opu Daeng Chelak. He assumed the title of Sultan Sallehuddin of Selangor in 1766. By the end of the 17th century, the Bugis had already begun to settle on the west coast of the Malayan Peninsula.

== Background ==
Salehuddin was born as Raja Lumu in 1705, the second eldest son of Bugis warrior Daeng Chelak and his first wife, Encik Tomita. Raja Lumu became the title of the first Raja of Selangor in 1743 and held it until he became the first Sultan of Selangor in 1766.

== Sultan of Selangor ==
Following Raja Lumu, two other Bugis chiefs settled in the Selangor area: Raja Tua in Klang and Daeng Kemboja in Linggi, south of Lukut. Raja Lumu originally met with opposition from the sultans of Perak and Johor, as well as from the Dutch, but eventually managed to consolidate his sovereignty. By 1770, his legitimacy was strengthened by marriage to the niece of the Sultan of Perak in November 1766.

By 1766, the newly crowned sultan used the name 'Selangor' as his Sultanate since the site of court administration was situated along the basin of the Selangor River.

The latter, Sultan Muhammad "invested Salehuddin with the insignia of Malay royalty and also attended the subsequent installation ceremony in Selangor". To this alliance, he soon added another, by marrying his daughter to the Sultan Abdullah Mukarram Shah of Kedah, the ruler of the most northerly of the western Malay sultanates.

== Marriages and issue ==
1) Engku Puan binti of Paduka Sri Sultan 'Ala ud-din Ri'ayat Shah bin Daeng Rilaga

- Paduka Sri Sultan Ibrahim Shah ibni al-Marhum Sultan Saleh ud-din, Sultan and Yang di-Pertuan Besar of Selangor
- Raja Nala ibni al-Marhum Sultan Saleh ud-din, Raja Muda
- Raja Penuh binti al-Marhum Sultan Saleh ud-din

2) A daughter of prince of Perak

- Raja Perak binti al-Marhum Sultan Saleh ud-din
- Raja Sharifa binti al-Marhum Sultan Saleh ud-din

Regnal titles
Preceded by none	Sultan of Selangor; 1742–1778	Succeeded by Ibrahim Shah of Selangor
