= Sultan of Selangor =

Function and history of the Selangor State Ruler

- سلطان سلاڠور
- State
- Arms of His Royal Highness the Sultan of Selangor

Incumbent
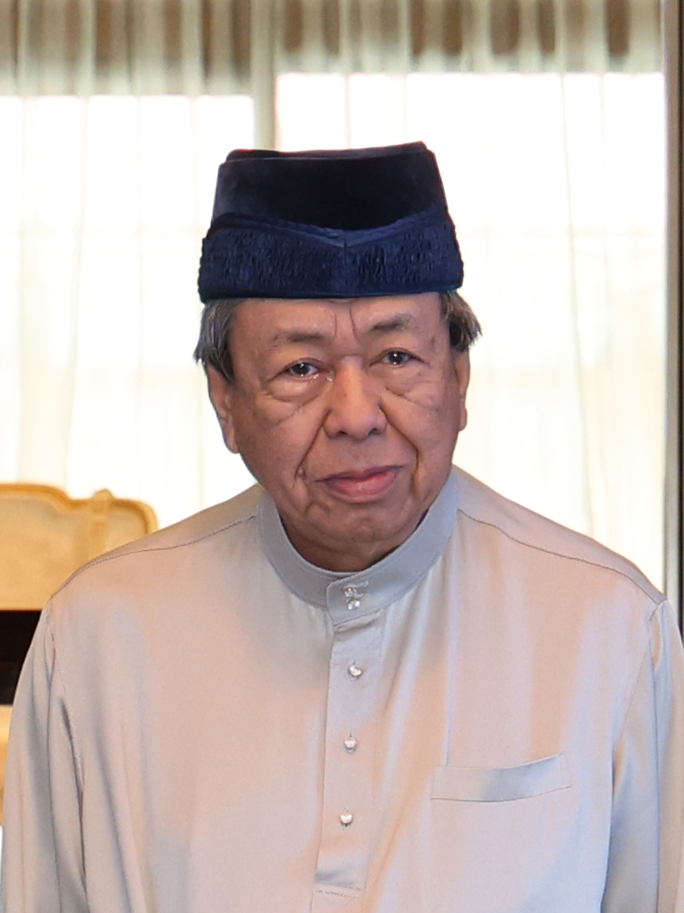
- Sultan Sharafuddin Idris Shah Al-Haj, 9th Sultan of Selangor since 22 November 2001
- coronation 8 March 2003

Details
- Style: His Royal Highness
- Heir apparent: Tengku Amir Shah, Raja Muda of Selangor
- First monarch: Sultan Sallehuddin Shah, 1st Sultan of Selangor
- House: the House of Opu Daeng Chelak of the House of Royal Buginese Riau of the House of Royal Buginese Luwu (originating from South Sulawesi)
- Formed: 1743; 283 years ago
- Residences: Istana Alam Shah, Klang
- Appointer: Hereditary

Sultan of Selangor (سلطان سلاڠور) is the title of the constitutional ruler of Selangor, Malaysia who is the head of state and head of the Islamic religion in Selangor. The current monarch, Sultan Sharafuddin Idris Shah ascended the throne on the death of his father, on 22 November 2001.

== History ==
=== 1743–1766: Pre-formation ===
The Sultans of Selangor are descended from a Bugis dynasty that claim descent from the rulers of Luwu in the southern part of Celebes (today known as Sulawesi). Nobles from this bloodline were involved in the dispute over the Johor-Riau Sultanate in the early 18th century, eventually placing their full support in the cause of Sulaiman Badrul Alam Shah of Johor of the Bendahara dynasty against the claimant to the Malaccan lineage, Raja Kechil. For this reason, the Bendahara rulers of Johor-Riau established close relations with the Bugis nobles, providing them with titles and control over many areas within the empire, including Selangor.

Daeng Chelak, one of the five Bugis warriors, married Sulaiman Badrul Alam Shah's sister, Tengku Mandak. He was made the second Yang di-Pertuan Muda of Riau from 1728 until 1745. He appointed his son, Raja Lumu to become Yamtuan Selangor on 1743. In the same year, Raja Lumu was recognised by the 14th Sultan of Perak, Sultan Muhammad Shah ibni Sultan Mansur Shah III as the Raja Selangor, after helping the Sultan ascended Perak's throne. He continued to hold the title until 1766.

=== 1766–1875: Beginnings of the Selangor Sultanate ===
Raja Lumu did not succeed his father after the latter's death in 1745. Instead, his first cousin, Daeng Kemboja was appointed as the third Yang di-Pertuan Muda of Riau. In February 1756, Sulaiman Badrul Alam Shah of Johor, who assumed Selangor is still a part of his territory, offered the Dutch to mine tin ore in Selangor after helping his nephew, Raja Mahmud winning a civil war against his step-brother, Raja Alam. His action was opposed by Daeng Kemboja, Raja Tua of Klang and Raja Lumu. Raja Lumu then sought to strengthen his influence and removed Selangor from Johor empire by seeking recognition from the 16th Sultan of Perak, Sultan Mahmud Shah ibni Sultan Muhammad Shah. He was installed by Sultan Mahmud Shah as the first Sultan of Selangor in November 1766, taking the regnal name, Sultan Salehuddin Shah.

After the death of Sultan Salehuddin Shah on 1778, he was succeeded by his son, Raja Ibrahim Marhum Saleh, who then used the title Sultan Ibrahim Shah. In 1784, he was defeated in the attack on Kuala Selangor by the Dutch, forcing him to leave Kota Malawati. He subsequently managed to occupy it back in less than a year with the help of the Pahang Kingdom. Sultan Ibrahim Shah allied himself with Perak Sultanate afterwards but the alliance fall apart in a debt dispute.

Following his death on 18 October 1826, he was succeeded by his son, Raja Muhammad who took on the title Sultan Muhammad Shah. He was unable to control his chiefs during his reign which resulted in the separation of Selangor into five individual territories; Bernam, Kuala Selangor, Kelang, Langat and Lukut. His reign also saw the opening of tin mines in Ampang District, which brought business to the people and the state.

After 31 years of reign, Sultan Muhammad died in late 1857 without appointing an heir. As a result, there was a huge dispute regarding who will succeed him as the Sultan of Selangor. His nephew, Raja Abdul Samad Raja Abdullah was finally chosen to be the next Sultan and he took on the title Sultan Abdul Samad. He gave the power of authority of Klang to Raja Abdullah and Langat to Tunku Kudin of Kedah, both of whom were his sons-in-law, in 1866 and 1868 respectively.

=== 1875–1957: Colonial Era ===
During Sultan Abdul Samad's reign, the Klang War broke out between Raja Abdullah and the previous ruler of Klang, Raja Mahdi. The involvement of British Empire in the war marks as their first involvement in Selangor's politics. The first British resident in Selangor, James Guthrie Davidson was also appointed during his reign. Sultan Abdul Samad died at the age of 93 in February 1898 and was buried at Makam Sultan Abdul Samad in Jugra.

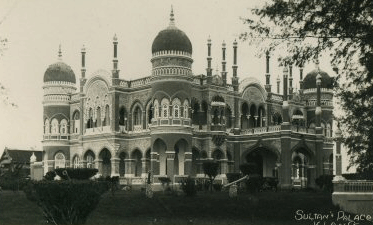
Mahkota Puri Palace

Raja Muda Sulaiman ibni Almarhum Raja Muda Musa, the grandson of Sultan Abdul Samad rose to the throne, taking the title Sultan Alaeddin Sulaiman Shah on 1898 as the fifth Sultan of Selangor. His reign saw the increase in construction of houses, shops, roads, and railways especially in Kuala Lumpur and Klang.

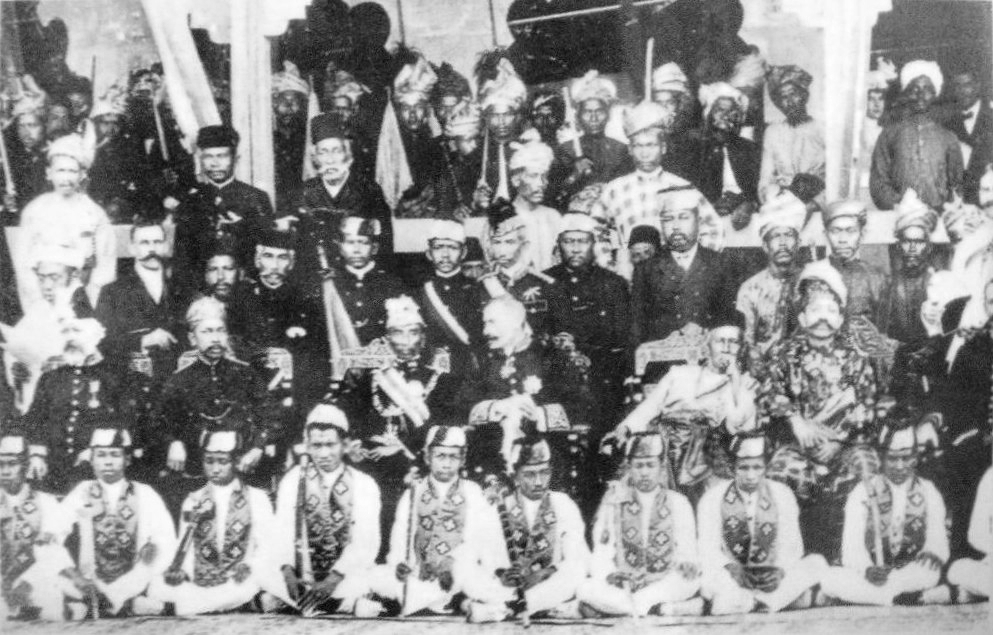
Sultan Alaeddin (sitting, second from left) during the second Durbar in 1903.

He oversaw the construction of Mahkota Puri Palace in 1905 and proceeded to live there for 35 years until his death. His first son, Tengku Musa Eddin was named the heir apparent in 1920 but he was dismissed in 1934 following the allegation from the then British resident, Theodore Samuel Adams as a gambler. Sultan Sulaiman pleaded the case to Secretary of State for the British Colonies but to no avail. Tengku Alam Shah, his third son was subsequently named the heir apparent in 1936.

Sultan Sulaiman was succeeded by Tengku Alam Shah in 1938, using the title Sultan Hisamuddin Alam Shah. In January 1942, following the Japanese occupation of Malaya, he was told to surrender his throne to his elder half-brother, Tengku Musa Eddin, whom the Japanese proclaimed as the new Sultan of Selangor, taking the title Sultan Musa Ghiatuddin Riayat Shah. Sultan Hisamuddin refused Japanese orders for him to work with them and stopped receiving the allowance awarded to him. Sultan Musa Ghiatuddin Riayat Shah was installed as the seventh Sultan of Selangor by the then Governor of Selangor, Lieutenant-General Shotaro Katayama in November 1943. He only ruled for three years, during the Japanese occupation. When the British returned after the war, he was dethroned and exiled to the Cocos Keeling Islands.

Sultan Hisamuddin resumed his reign in September 1945. In the same year, he signed the Malayan Union treaty, albeit under protest, along with the rest of the rulers of Malaya at the time. He later rejected the establishment of Malayan Union and openly supported the Malay nationalists who opposed the plan. In 1950, he demolished Mahkota Puri Palace and built Istana Alam Shah, which is still used as the official residence of the Sultan of Selangor to this day.

=== 1957–present: After Independence ===
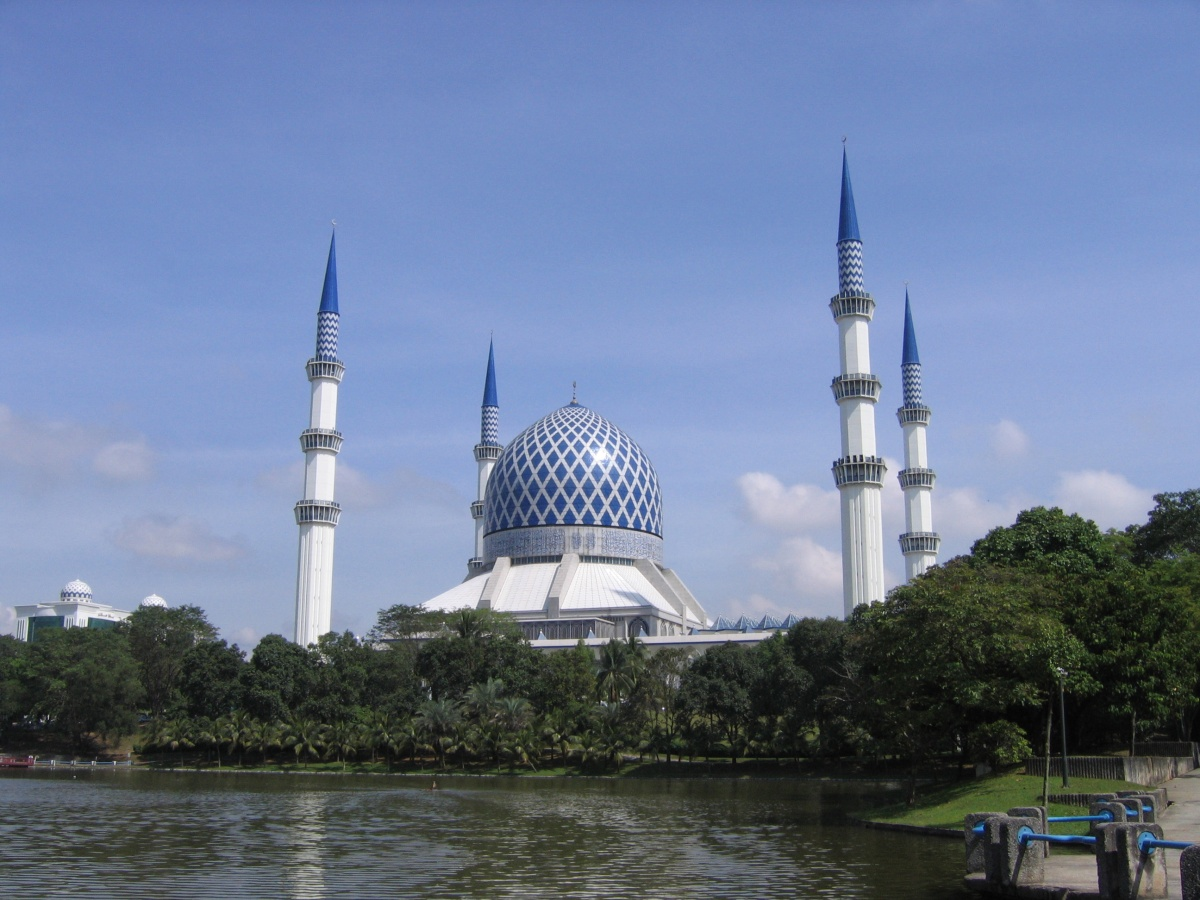
Sultan Salahuddin Abdul Aziz Shah Mosque, also known as the blue mosque, the second largest mosque in South East Asia

Sultan Hisamuddin continued to rule Selangor following the independence of Federation of Malaya. He was appointed as the Deputy Yang di-Pertuan Agong on 3 August 1957. He became the second Yang di-Pertuan Agong of Malaya after the death of Tuanku Abdul Rahman in 1960.

Tengku Abdul Aziz, the eldest son of Sultan Hisamuddin took the throne following his father's death. He used the title Sultan Salahuddin Abdul Aziz Shah. In 1974, he signed the 1974 Federal Territory of Kuala Lumpur Agreement which then established the Federal Territory in Malaysia. Later, he commissioned the building of Kota Darul Ehsan arch to commemorate this event and as a border mark between Kuala Lumpur and Selangor. After Kuala Lumpur was made Federal Territory, he proclaimed Shah Alam as the new capital of Selangor. The capital is named after his father, Sultan Hisamuddin Alam Shah. His most notable legacy is the Sultan Salahuddin Abdul Aziz Mosque, the largest mosque in Malaysia. Sultan Salahuddin was installed as the eleventh Yang di-Pertuan Agong in 1999 for two years until his death in 2001.

His son, Tengku Idris Shah, ascended the throne in 2001, taking the title of Sultan Sharafuddin Idris Shah.

== Constitutional role ==
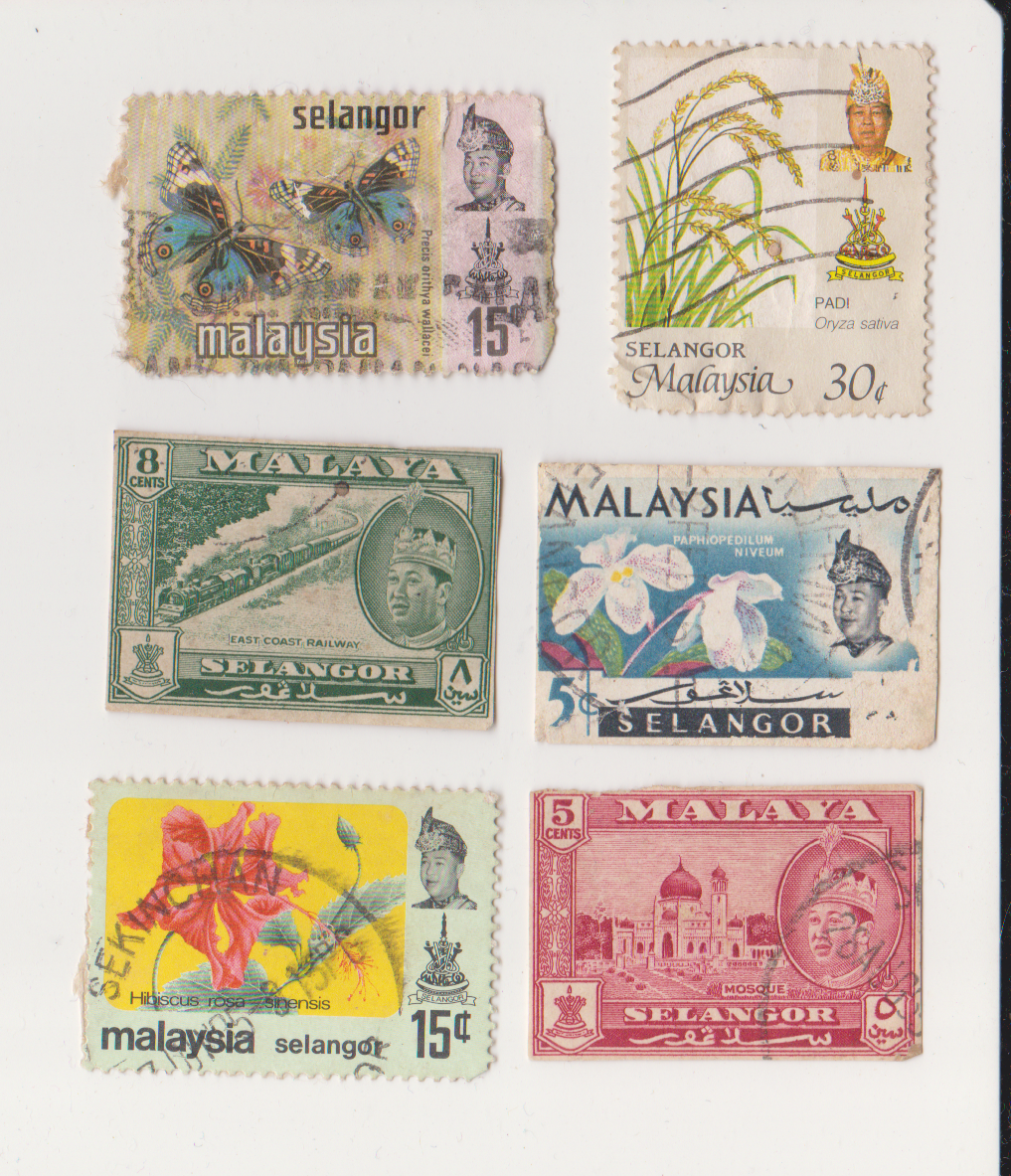
Stamps depicting the face of the Sultan of Selangor throughout the years

In the Laws of the Constitution of Selangor 1959, the Sultan (otherwise referred to as His Highness) is the Head of state and Head of Islam Religion of the state of Selangor. Oath of allegiance are made to the Sultan. Duli Yang Maha Mulia is the state anthem, and the Sultan appears on postage stamps. He has the power of executive authority of the state. His Highness has the responsibility to safeguard the special position of the Malays and the legitimate interest of other communities.

Whenever necessary, the Sultan is responsible for appointing the State Executive Council, of which he has to appoint a Menteri Besar, whom acts as the head of government, and 4 to 10 members of the Legislative Assembly. The Menteri Besar takes office by citing an oath in front of the Sultan in a ceremony. The Sultan also holds a weekly audience with the Menteri Besar before State Council meetings for him to inform the agenda that will be discussed in the meetings.

=== Royal prerogative ===
Some of the government's executive authority is theoretically and nominally vested in the Sovereign and is known as the royal prerogative. His Highness shall act in accordance with the advice of state executive council but he may act in his discretion in the performance of the following: appointment of Menteri Besar, the withholding of consent to request the dissolution of the Legislative Assembly, making a request for a meeting of the Conference of Rulers (concern solely about the privileges, position, honours and dignities of Their Highnesses or religious acts, observance or ceremonies), any function as the head of the Islam religion or relating to the custom of the Malays, appointment of an heir (or heirs), consort, regent or the Council of Regency, the appointment of persons to Malay customary ranks, titles, honours, dignities, and the designations of the functions appertaining thereto, and the regulation of royal courts and palaces. The Sultan also can grant a pardon to any offense committed in the state.

Only the Sultan has the power to confer titles and dignities, and institute the Orders and Badges of Honour and Dignity to whom he sees fit after consulting the Selangor Council of Royal Court. He also has the power to degrade any person of any title and order that has been conferred by him or his precedence.

=== Conference of Rulers ===
The Sultan of Selangor has a permanent seat in the conference of rulers as he is one of the nine Malay sultans. During the meeting, none of the Malay Rulers takes precedence over the others and all are considered equal. The member of the conference has the power to elect one of the Malay Rulers as the Yang di-Pertuan Agong (the head of state of Malaysia) and Deputy of Yang di-Pertuan Agong every five years. Sultan of Selangor is eligible to stand as a candidate for such occasions. Sultan Hisamuddin Alam Shah and Sultan Salahuddin Abdul Aziz Shah were Malaysia's second and eleventh Yang di-Pertuan Agong respectively.

== Succession ==
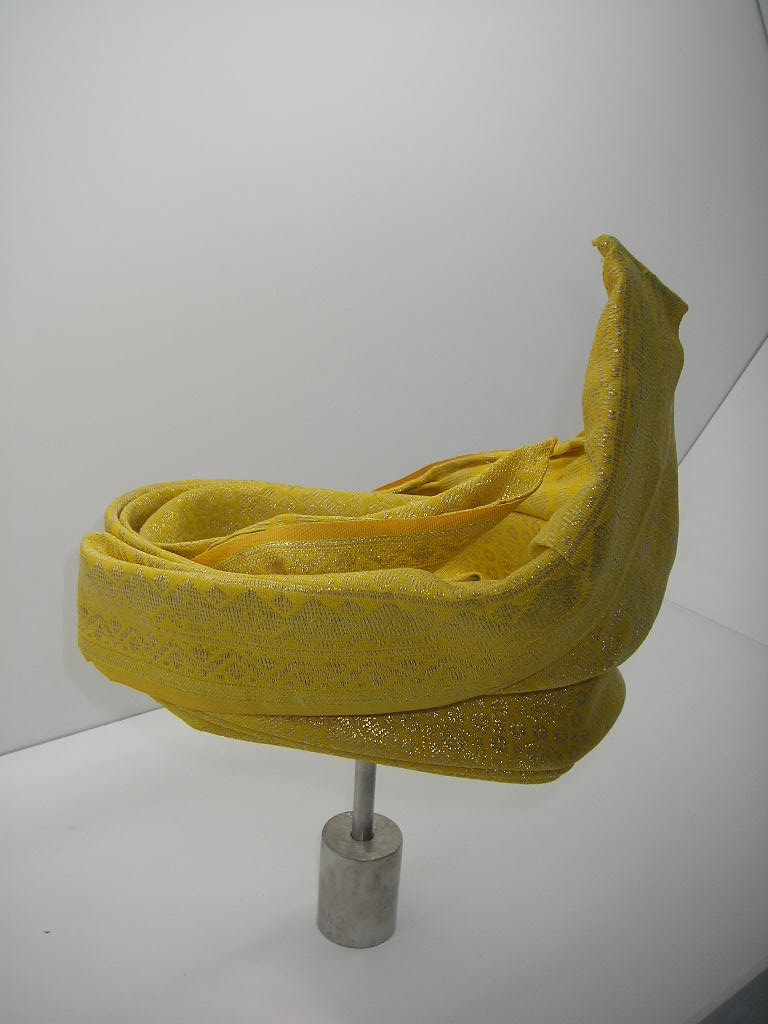
The Selangor Sultan's Headgear (Solek Balung Raja) is the yellow songket destar, an official headdress for the present Sultan of Selangor. It is worn during the State's Royal Custom and ritual ceremonies such as Coronation Ceremony, Royal Birthday and so on. The destar`s design is adapted from Tengkolok Balung Ayam from Perak after a royal wedding between the two states.

The succession order of Selangor sultanate is determined by agnatic primogeniture. No female may become ruler, and female line descendants are generally excluded from succession. According to Laws of the Constitution of Selangor 1959 (in Malay language: Undang-undang Tubuh Negeri Selangor 1959), the Sultan of Selangor must be Malay, royal in blood, descendant of the Selangor sultanate, male and a Muslim. The crown prince is also subjected to the same rule. The constitution states that the Sultan must come from the line of Sultan Hisamuddin Alam Shah, only if there are no longer eligible descendant of him, then the Sultan should be chosen from the descendant of Sultan Alauddin Sulaiman Shah and so on.

The order of the descendants, in descending order of degree of kinship : Sultan Hisamuddin Alam Shah, Sultan Alauddin Sulaiman Shah, Sultan Abdul Samad, Sultan Ibrahim Shah, Sultan Salehuddin.

=== Current order of succession ===
The current order of succession is as follow:

- Sultan Salahuddin Abdul Aziz Shah (1926–2001)
  - Sultan Sharafuddin Idris Shah (born 1945)
    - (1) Tengku Amir Shah, Raja Muda, the Crown Prince (born 1990)
  - (2) Tengku Sulaiman Abdul Aziz Shah, Tengku Laksamana (born 1950)
    - (3) Tengku Shakirinal Sulaiman Shah (born 1980)
      - (4) Tengku Mahmood Shakirinal Shah (born 2010)
      - (5) Tengku Sulaiman Shakirinal Shah (born 2013)
      - (6) Tengku Abdulaziz Shakirinal Shah (born 2017)
    - (7) Tengku Salehuddin Sulaiman Shah, Tengku Indera Bijaya Diraja (born 1982)
      - (8) Tengku Ibrahim Salehuddin Shah (born 2014)
    - (9) Tengku Shahrain Sulaiman Shah (born 1985)
    - (10) Tengku Shariffuddin Sulaiman Shah (born 1987)
  - (11) Tengku Abdul Samad Shah, Tengku Panglima Besar (born 1953)
    - (12) Tengku Musahiddin Shah, Tengku Seri Perkasa Diraja (born 1984)
  - (13) Tengku Ahmad Shah, Tengku Indira Setia (born 1955)
    - (14) Tengku Alam Shah Ammiruddin (born 1982)

- previous Sultan - current Sultan

== List of sultans ==
The following is the list of the Sultans of Selangor:

Name	Portrait	Birth	Marriage(s)	Death	Claim
Salehuddin of Selangor; 1743 – 1778 (35 years)		Raja Lumu bin Daeng Chelak c. 1705 Son of Daeng Chelak bin Daeng Rilaga and Tomita	(1) Engku Puan binti Sultan Alauddin Riayat Shah of Riau; 3 children (2) Unknown wife December 1770; 2 children	1778; Age around 73 years old	Installed by Mahmud Shah of Perak in 1766 Treaty with Sulaiman Badrul Alam Shah of Johor on 8 January 1758
Ibrahim Shah of Selangor; 1778 – 1826 (48 years)		Raja Ibrahim Marhum Salleh bin Raja Lumu c. 1736 Son of Sallehuddin of Selangor and Engku Puan binti Sultan Alauddin Riayat Shah of Riau	(1) Tunku Chik of Kedah at least 1 child (2) Raja Andak binti Daeng Kemboja of Riau div.1776 at least 4 children (3) Unknown wife from Kedah (4) Che' Puan Besar Long Jalijah binti Dato' Husain at least 1 child (5) Encik Salama at least 1 child (6) Encik Shaima at least 1 child (7) Tun Salama binti Tun Abdul Majid of Johor and Pahang; 1784 (8) Unknown wife 1784 (9) Tengku Ampuan Tengah binti Raja Haji of Riau; 1796 at least 1 child	27 October 1826; Age around 90 years old	Eldest son of Sallehuddin of Selangor
Muhammad Shah of Selangor; 27 October 1826 – 6 January 1857 (30 years, 72 days)		Raja Muhammad bin Raja Ibrahim Marhum Salleh 1772 Son of Ibrahim Shah of Selangor and Che' Puan Besar Long Halijah	(1) Tengku Ampuan Basik at least 2 children (2) Raja Asiah binti Sultan Ali Alauddin Shah of Riau after April 1827 at least 4 children (3) Unknown wife	6 January 1857; Age around 85 years old	Eldest surviving son of Ibrahim Shah of Selangor
Abdul Samad of Selangor; Sultan Sir Abdul Samad Shah; 6 January 1857 – 6 February 1898 (41 years, 32 days)		Raja Abdul Samad bin Raja Abdullah 1804 Son of Raja Abdullah bin Ibrahim of Selangor and Che' Lipah	(1) Tengku Ampuan Atfah; 1844 – div.1873 7 children (2) Unknown wife c. 8 November 1874; 5 children (3) Che Fatimah binti Abdul Ghani; 1887	6 February 1898; Age around 93 years old	Nephew and son-in-law of Muhammad of Selangor Grandson of Ibrahim of Selangor
Sulaiman of Selangor; Sultan Alauddin Sulaiman Shah; 17 February 1898 – 31 March 1938 (40 years, 42 days)		Raja Sulaiman bin Raja Musa 11 September 1863 Son of Raja Muda Musa bin Abdul Samad of Selangor and Raja Buntal Raimah binti Raja Barkat	(1) Tengku Ampuan Paduka Seri Negara Tunku Maharum binti Tengku Dziauddin @ Kudin of Kedah; 1891 – d.1908 5 children (2) Cik Hasnah @ Aminah binti Pilong c. 1895; 4 children (3) Hajah Sofia binti Haji Abdul Ghani; 1899 (4) Cik Rogayah binti Muhammad Amin c. 1908 – d.1909 1 child (5) Cik Chik binti Abdullah c. 1908; 7 children (6) Tengku Ampuan Zubaidah binti Sultan Abdul Jalil of Perak; May 1910 – d.17 October 1918; 6 children (7) Cik Anjung Negara Maimunah binti Abdullah c. 1910; 5 children (8) Cik Puri Negara Bidayah binti Ahmad c. 1912; 5 children (9) Tengku Ampuan Paduka Seri Negara Raja Fatimah binti Sultan Idris of Perak; September 1921; 5 children (10) Raja Bulat @ Mariam binti Raja Ahmad c. 1925; 4 children (11) Cik Johari binti Abdullah c. 1933; 2 children	31 March 1938; Age 74 years old	Grandson of Abdul Samad of Selangor
Hisamuddin of Selangor; Sultan Hisamuddin Alam Shah; 4 April 1939 – 15 January 1942 (2 years, 287 days) 14 September 1945 – 1 September 1960 (14 years, 354 days)		Tengku Alam Shah ibni Sultan Alaeddin Sulaiman Shah 13 May 1898 Son of Sulaiman of Selangor and Cik Hasnah binti Pilong	(1) Tengku Ampuan Jemaah; 1919; 1 child (2) Che' Puan Kalsum binti Mahmud; 1927; 6 children (3) Raja Halijah binti Sultan Idris of Perak	1 September 1960; Age 62 years old	Third son of Sulaiman of Selangor
Musa Ghiatuddin Riayat Shah of Selangor; 15 January 1942 – 14 September 1945 (3 years, 243 days)		Tengku Musaeddin bin Tengku Sulaiman Shah 9 December 1893 Son of Sulaiman of Selangor and Tengku Ampuan Maharum	(1) Tengku Permaisuri Sharifah Mastura binti Syed Ahmad Shahabuddin; 1912 (2) Tengku Jeriah binti Tengku Arifin (3) Che Puan Anjang binti Abdullah	8 November 1955; Age 61 years old	Eldest son of Sulaiman of Selangor Half-brother of Hisamuddin of Selangor Installed as Sultan during the Japanese occupation of Malaya, after Sultan Hisamuddin was forced to abdicate by the Japanese
Salahuddin of Selangor; Sultan Salahuddin Abdul Aziz Shah; 3 September 1960 – 21 November 2001 (41 years, 80 days)		Tengku Abdul Aziz Shah bin Tengku Alam Shah 8 March 1926 Son of Hisamuddin of Selangor and Tengku Ampuan Jemaah	(1) Raja Nur Saidatul Ihsan binti Tengku Badar Shah; 1943 – div. 9 children (2) Cik Mahiran binti Muhammad Rais; 1954 – div. 1 child (3) Tengku Ampuan Rahimah; 11 March 1956 – d. 27 June 1993; 2 children (4) Sharifah Salmah binti Syed Ahmad al-Kaf; 16 November 1961 – div. 5 February 1962 (5) Permaisuri Siti Aishah; 3 May 1990	21 November 2001; Age 75 years old	Eldest son of Hisamuddin of Selangor
Sharafuddin of Selangor; Sultan Sharafuddin Idris Shah; 22 November 2001 – present (25 years, 1 day)		Tengku Idris Shah bin Tengku Abdul Aziz Shah 24 December 1945 Son of Salahuddin of Selangor and Raja Nur Saidatul Ehsan binti Tengku Badar Shah	(1) Raja Zarina binti Raja Zainal; 1968 – div. 1987; 2 children (2) Nur Lisa Idris binti Abdullah; 1988 – div. 1997; 1 child (3) Tengku Permaisuri Norashikin; 2016 – present		Eldest son of Salahuddin of Selangor

== Official residences ==
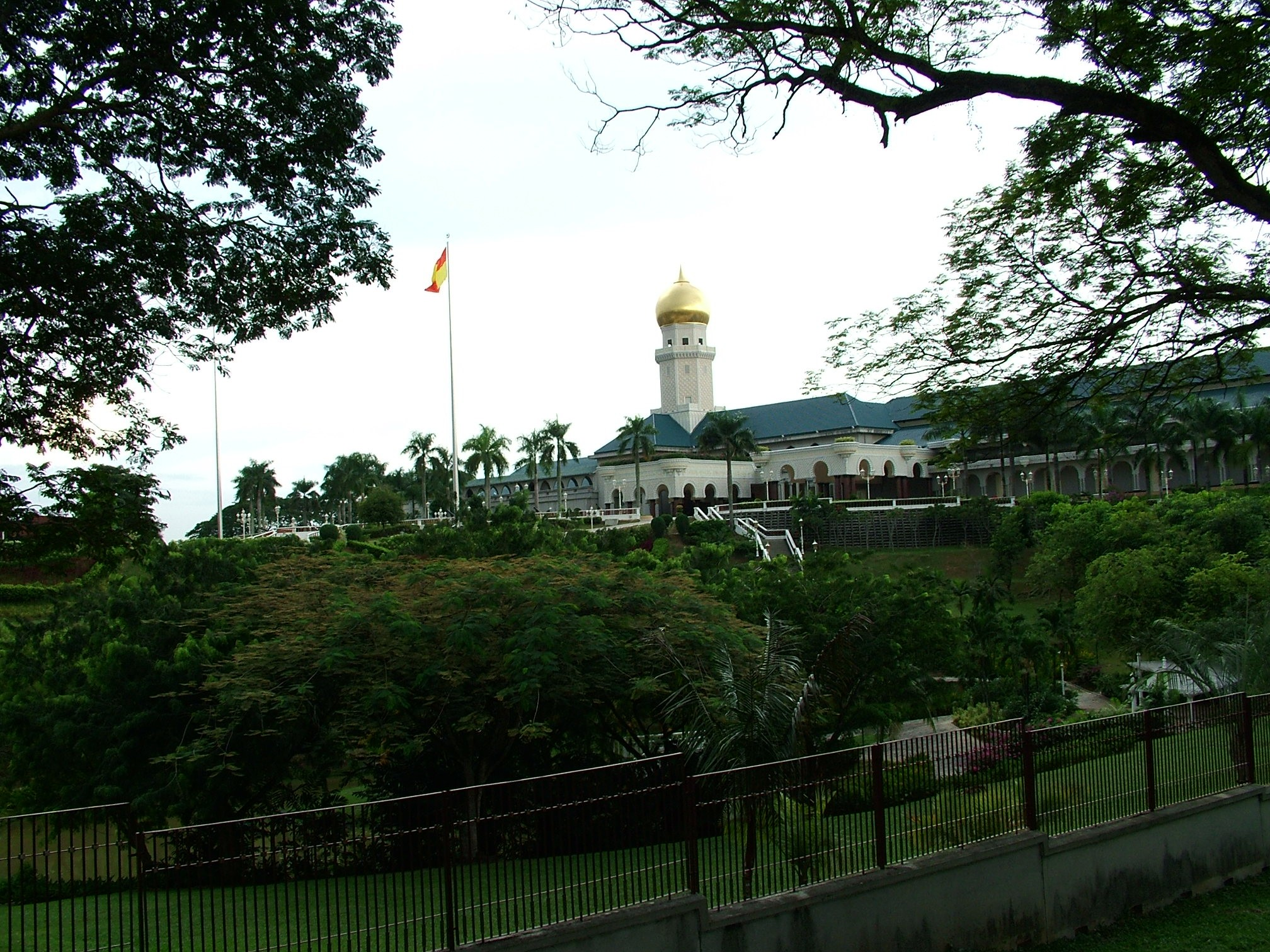
The palace of the Sultan of Selangor in Klang

The sovereign's official residence in Klang is Istana Alam Shah. It is the palace where the Sultan carried out his official duties and the site that held formal events involving him such as the coronation ceremony. Another official residence is Istana Darul Ehsan, located in Putrajaya. It was built as a sign of appreciation to Sultan of Selangor from the Federal government for ceding Putrajaya to become a federal territory and become the federal administrative centre of Malaysia. The sovereign's official residence in Shah Alam is Istana Bukit Kayangan. Istana Mestika is the official residence of the Raja Muda of Selangor.

Historically, Kota Melawati in Kuala Selangor had been the residence of the three earliest Sultan since Selangor Sultanate started there. Today, the fort had become a tourist attraction besides housing one of the royal mausoleums and the location of the new moon sighting. Sultan Abdul Samad lived at Istana Jugra in Jugra, Kuala Langat since his administration center was located there. It was built in 1876 and was where Sultan Alauddin Sulaiman Shah's coronation took place. Mahkota Puri Palace (now the site of Istana Alam Shah) was built by the British in 1889 for Sultan Alauddin Sulaiman Shah so his administration center is closed to the British colonial administration center in Kuala Lumpur, thus become his official residence.

== Styles and titles ==
The title used by the ruling prince is Duli Yang Maha Mulia Sultan dan Yang di-Pertuan Selangor Darul Ehsan Serta Segala Daerah Takluknya or Sultan and Ruler of the State of Selangor Darul Ehsan and all its dependencies, with the style of His Royal Highness.

For example, the present sovereign full style and title is "Duli Yang Maha Mulia Sultan Sharafuddin Idris Shah Alhaj ibni Almarhum Sultan Salahuddin Abdul Aziz Shah Alhaj, Sultan dan Yang di-Pertuan Selangor Darul Ehsan Serta Segala Daerah Takluknya" or in English; "His Royal Highness Sultan Sharafuddin Idris Shah Al-Haj ibni Almarhum Sultan Salahuddin Abdul Aziz Shah Al-Haj, The Sultan and Sovereign Ruler of Selangor Abode of Sincerity and its Sovereign Dependencies".

The heir apparent will use the title Duli Yang Teramat Mulia Raja Muda Selangor Darul Ehsan with the styled of His Royal Highness.

== See also ==
- House of Opu Daeng Chelak
- Selangor Council of the Royal Court
- Family tree of Selangor monarchs
- Family tree of Malaysian monarchs
- List of monarchies
- Kingdom of Luwu
