= Ibrahim Shah of Selangor =

Sultan of Selangor (r. 1782–1826)

Ibrahim إبراهيم
- Sultan of Selangor
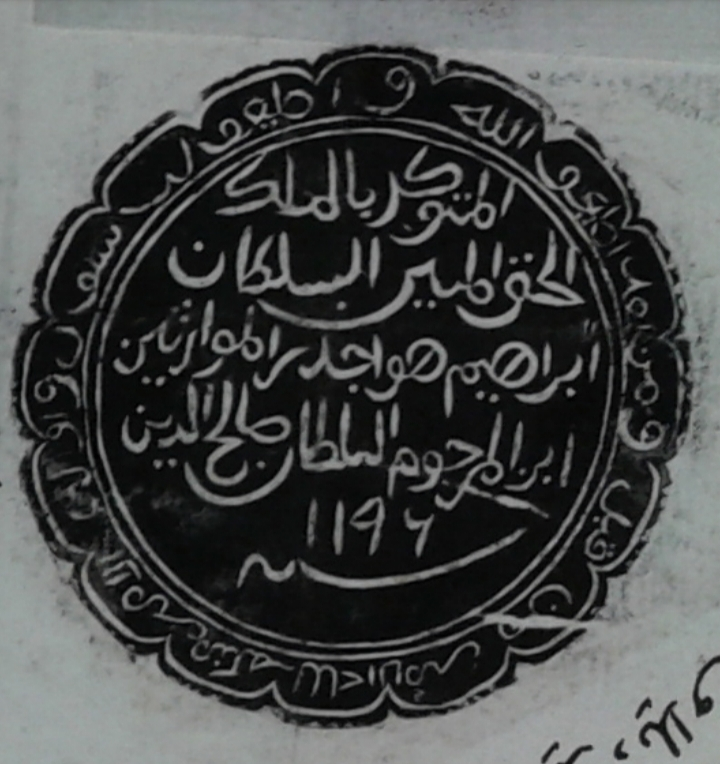
- Royal seal of Ibrahim of Selangor

2nd Sultan of Selangor
- Reign: 1782 – 27 October 1826
- Predecessor: Salehuddin of Selangor
- Successor: Muhammad Shah of Selangor
- Born: Raja Ibrahim bin Raja Lumu c. 1736
- Died: 27 October 1826 (aged 89–90); Kuala Selangor, Selangor
- Burial: Bukit Melawati Royal Mausoleum, Bukit Melawati, Kuala Selangor
- Spouses: Tunku Chik of Kedah; Raja Andak binti Daeng Kamboja (div. 1776); Cik Puan Besar Cik Long Halijah binti Daeng Loklok Husain; Encik Salama; Encik Shaima; Tun Salama binti Tun Abdul Majid (m. 1784); Tengku Ampuan Raja Tengah binti Almarhum Raja Haji (m. 1796)
Names
- Raja Ibrahim bin Raja Lumu
Regnal name
- Sultan Ibrahim Shah ibni Almarhum Sultan Salehuddin Shah
- House: Opu Daeng Chelak
- Father: Sultan Salehuddin Shah ibni Almarhum Yamtuan Muda Riau II Opu Daeng Chelak
- Mother: Engku Puan binti Paduka Sri Sultan Alauddin Riayat Shah of Riau
- Religion: Sunni Islam

Ibrahim Shah ibni Almarhum Sultan Salehuddin Shah (Jawi: سلطان إبراهيم شاه ابن المرحوم سلطان صالح الدين شاه; born Raja Ibrahim bin Raja Lumu; c. 1736 – 27 October 1826) was the second Sultan of Selangor. He served as sultan from 1782 until his death in 1826.

He was known as a strong energetic ruler and an Anglophile. On 13 July 1784, as part of the Riau War the Dutch captured Kuala Selangor despite having built the Kota Melawati fort to protect the area and ended up getting deposed and exiled. Sultan Ibrahim recaptured the fort in a raid in 1785 with help from Pahang. After helping Perak remove the Siamese presence in Perak, Ibrahim demanded tribute for the help provided.

In 1818, Selangor began political relations with the United Kingdom. Contemporary writer Thomas Newbold (1807–1850) mentions that after his successor Muhammad Shah took the throne, the territory lapsed into comparative decay, where Muhammad Shah committed piracy, robberies and levied contributions from the local inhabitants, which then lead to emigration.

Regnal titles
Preceded by Raja Lumu	Sultan of Selangor; 1778–1826	Succeeded by Muhammad Shah of Selangor
