= Tunku Dhiauddin ibn Sultan Zainal Rashid I =

Tunku Dhiauddin ibni Sultan Zainal Rashid al-Mu'azzam Shah I
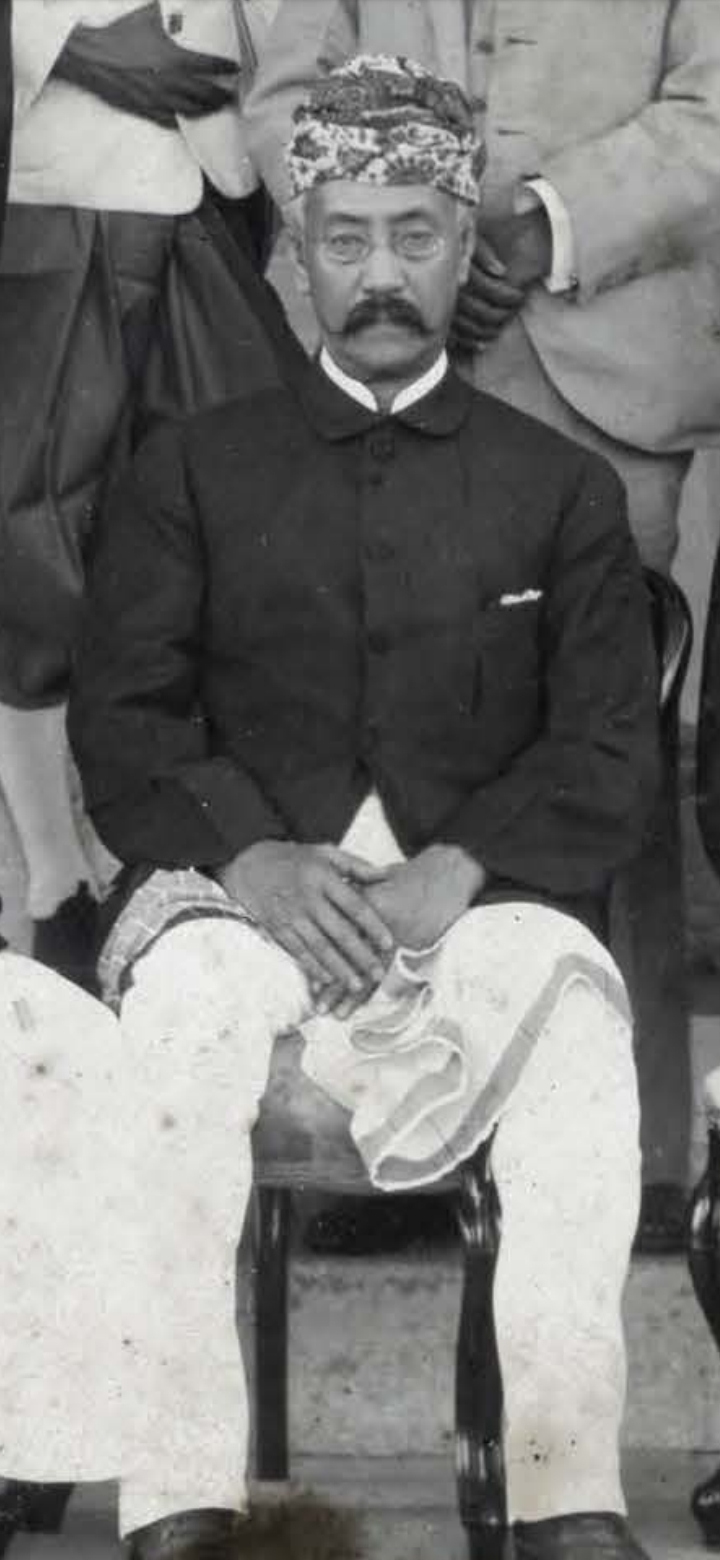
- Tunku Dhiauddin
- Predecessor: Sultan Ahmad Tajuddin Halim Shah II
- Successor: Sultan Ahmad Tajuddin Mukarram Shah III
- Born: 1835
- Died: 25 May 1909 (age74)
- Spouse: Raja Arfah II binti Sultan Abdul Samad
- Father: Sultan Zainal Rashid Al-Mu'adzam Shah I (23rd Sultan of Kedah )
- Mother: -
- Occupation: -
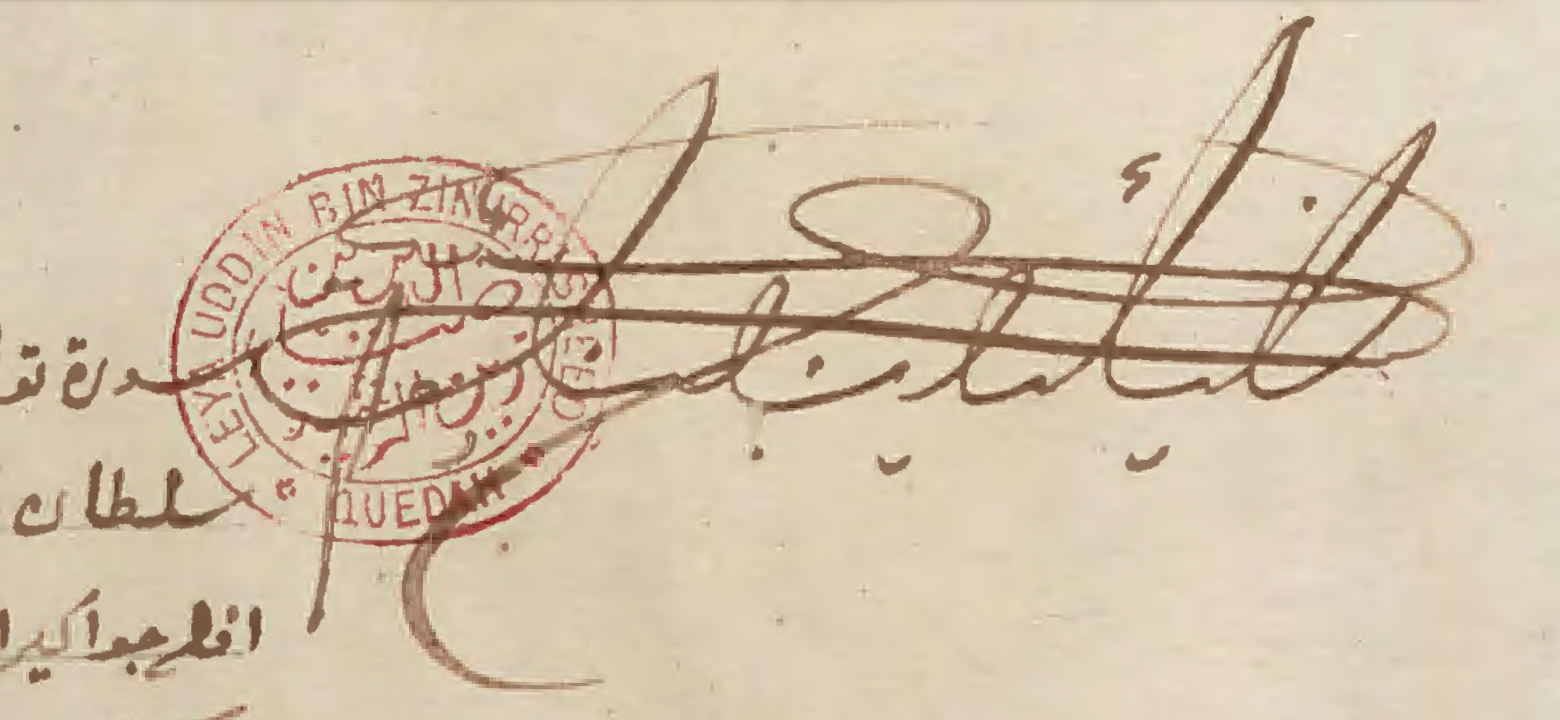
- Signature

Tunku Dhiauddin ibni Sultan Zainal Rashid I (1835 – 25 May 1909) or better known as Tengku Kudin (Jawi: تڠكو كودين) was a prince of the Sultanate of Kedah. He was born in Penang in 1835.

He is said to have been influenced by the European way of life and received a semi-European education. His grandfather was Sultan Ahmad Tajuddin Halim Shah II and his elder brother was Sultan Ahmad Tajuddin Mukarram Shah.

He was appointed as the Raja Muda (Crown Prince) of Kedah during the reign of Sultan Ahmad Tajuddin III but was removed from office due to his involvement in the Klang War, the Selangor Civil War.

He was appointed by Sultan Abdul Samad as the Viceroy (Wakil Yamtuan) of the Selangor government on 26 June 1868 after he married the Princess of Sultan Abdul Samad, Raja Arfah II.

== Family ==
In June 1868, Tengku Kudin married Raja Arfah, daughter of Sultan Abdul Samad.

== Involvement in the Klang War ==
While Tengku Kudin was in Selangor, a war broke out between Raja Mahadi and Raja Abdullah bin Raja Jaafar and was known as the Klang War. Tengku Kudin was appointed by Sultan Abdul Samad as his Absolute Representative. Among his duties was to resolve the war between Raja Mahadi and Raja Ismail (son of Raja Abdullah). The power of attorney reads:

In the Hijrah of the Prophet Sallallahu 'alaihi wasallam 1285, on the day of Arba', 5 Rabiulawal, I, Sultan Abdul Samad ibni Tengku Abdullah, who is seated on the throne of the Kingdom of Selangor in Bandar Temasya, have bestowed this letter on Tunku Dhiauddin ibni al-Marhum Sultan Zainul Rashid, who has become our son (son-in-law). We declare to all the sons of the king, the Great Ones and all the people who abide by our command that we have handed over this country and its conquered territories to our son Tunku Dhiauddin to be ruled and developed by him for our benefit and the sons of Raja Musa, Raja Kahar and Raja Ya'akub and also for the benefit of all the people of this country, so that they all receive justice in all matters. We have given authority to our son Tunku Dhiauddin to do anything that can develop our country and that benefits us.

He carry out mediation between the warring parties, first on 26 June 1868. Raja Mahadi could not accept Tengku Kudin. Meanwhile, the sons of Sultan Abdul Samad, namely Raja Kahar, Raja Musa and Raja Ya'akub, were also dissatisfied with the power given to Tengku Kudin. Including the Orang Besar of Selangor, Dato' Bandar Langat, also opposed the granting of this power.

In 1869, Raja Ismail with the help of Raja Sulaiman bin Raja Hasan from Sungai Raya launched an attack on Raja Mahadi. Meanwhile, Raja Ismail also asked for help from Tengku Kudin. This combined force attacked Raja Mahadi in Klang. Tengku Kudin arrived in Klang in October 1869. He sent a letter to Raja Mahadi stating that he had come to reconcile the dispute between Raja Mahadi and Raja Ismail. Tengku Kudin's proposal was not accepted by Raja Mahadi. Tengku Kudin informed Sultan Abdul Samad of Raja Mahadi's attitude. Accordingly, Sultan Abdul Samad sent 200 men to Klang to assist Tengku Kudin's forces.

Tengku Kudin launched an attack on Raja Mahadi's fort. Meanwhile, Tengku Kudin blocked the supply of food to Raja Mahadi and the tin trade between Klang and outside parties. In the attack, Tengku Kudin was assisted by a force under the command of De Fontaine. De Fontaine bombarded Raja Mahadi's fort on the Hill in Klang. The war dragged on until 1870. In 1870, Raja Mahadi was finally unable to overcome Tengku Kudin's forces and abandoned his fort in Klang; while his fort in Kuala Selangor was abandoned in 1871.

However, in 1872, Raja Mahadi came again, this time he gained the support of several Malay chiefs, some of them members of the royal family of Selangor. Raja Mahadi's forces succeeded in controlling Kuala Selangor and Klang. However, Tengku Kudin's forces, assisted by Yap Ah Loy and a group of Pahang soldiers led by Rasu bin Shahrom (under order by Sultan Ahmad Muʽazzam, Raja bendahara of Pahang), counterattacked in 1873. Raja Mahadi was defeated and retreated. Raja Bendahara supported Tengku Kudin after him counter offer Raja Mahadi in obtaining their assistance.

In 1874, Raja Mahadi took refuge in Singapore. Raja Mahadi continued to plan to recapture Klang. In the meantime, the British government offered an allowance of $350.00 a month to end his struggle. This offer was rejected by Raja Mahadi, resulting in his imprisonment in Singapore. He was later released because the British did not have solid evidence to detain him. The Governor of the Straits Settlements offered Raja Mahadi a return to Klang, but Sultan Abdul Samad did not agree. Raja Mahadi died in Singapore on 10 January 1882.

=== Dismissal ===
Angered by Tengku Kudin's involvement in the Selangor war, Sultan Ahmad Tajuddin Mukarram Shah of Kedah stripped him of his position as Raja Muda of Kedah in 1872, appointing his younger brother, Tunku Yaakub, to the role instead.

== Post-Klang War ==
Tengku Kudin was removed by the British when the British felt that his involvement in the Selangor administration would cause the Civil War conflict to continue. Therefore, he was awarded a compensation of $30,000 in bonds and given a monthly pension of $500, while his wife was given $200 a month paid by the Selangor government. After that, Tengku Kudin returned to Kedah and was involved in the conflict over the Kedah throne. His role in Kedah politics is considered to be that of an opposition figure.

== Death ==
Tengku Kudin died in Penang. His body was brought back to Kedah and buried at the Kedah Royal Mausoleum.

== Legacy ==
Tengku Kudin left a notable historical legacy in both Selangor and Penang:

- Role in Selangor's History: As Viceroy, his victory in the Klang War with British and Pahang support paved the way for the establishment of the British Residency system in Selangor in 1874.
- Udini House: During his later life in Penang, he built a hilltop residence known as Udini House in Gelugor, completed around 1882.
- Eponyms:
  - Jalan Tunku Kudin: A major road in Gelugor, Penang, was named after him near the site of his former estate.
  - SMK Tengku Kudin: A secondary school in Raub, Pahang, bears his name.
