= Raja Mahadi =

Selangor Nobleman

Orang Besar Daerah Klang Raja Mahadi
- Born: Raja Mahadi
- Died: 1882; Singapore
- Burial place: Mahmoodiah Royal Mausoleum, Johor Bahru
- Occupation: Nobleman
- Father: Raja Sulaiman ibni Sultan Muhammad Shah

Raja Mahadi (Jawi: راج مهدي) was a Selangor nobleman who was a key protagonist in the Selangor Civil War, which lasted from 1867 to 1874. He occupied the position of Orang Besar Daerah Klang between 1867 till his exile to Singapore on 1874.

== History ==
Raja Mahadi was born as a son of Raja Sulaiman, eldest son of Sultan Muhammad Shah.

In 1839, Sultan Muhammad Shah gave the Klang River valley to his eldest son, Raja Sulaiman, but it was found that Raja Sulaiman did not really try to get much revenue from the Klang district. After Raja Sulaiman died, Sultan Muhammad gave the Klang River valley district to his brother-in-law, Raja Abdullah, instead of giving it to Raja Mahadi, the son of the late Raja Sulaiman. Raja Abdullah and his brother Raja Juma'at had previously helped Raja Sulaiman settle a debt incurred during a failed mining venture. Raja Mahadi was not satisfied and thought that he should have inherited the Klang district but his rights were simply set aside.

In 1866, Raja Abdullah appointed two Singaporean merchants named W.H. Reed and Baba Tan Kim Cheng as official tax collectors in the Klang district, and in all the areas under King Abdullah's rule, namely Kuala Lumpur, Petaling, Kanching and Ampang. According to custom, the children of the king were exempted from paying taxes. The custom was abolished due to the greed of the two tax collectors.

At the time of the new tax regulations, Raja Mahadi was in Malacca on business, trading goods from the Straits Settlements to be sold in Klang and around the Kuala Lumpur mining area.

When Raja Mahadi returned to Selangor about a month after the regulations came into effect, Raja Mahadi brought two chests of opium to be sold to Chinese miners in Kuala Lumpur. He was asked to pay a tax of $100. He refused to pay the tax, which led to his trade being confiscated. Raja Mahadi felt that the person who had occupied his position illegally according to custom had acted beyond the bounds

In 1866, he build his own fortress called Kota Raja Mahadi at Bukit Kota. Later that year, a fight erupted between the Sumatrans, especially the Batu Bara people, and the Bugis in the Dato' Bandar Yasih fortress in Kuala Lumpur. Dato' Bandar Yasih was a follower of Raja Abdullah whom he brought from Riau.

Muhammad Akib,leader of the Batu Bara people and his brother Nonggok complained to Raja Abdullah and demanded that the Bugis be punished for committing the murders, but the demand was ignored by Raja Abdullah. Then Muhammad Akib went to see Raja Mahadi to complain about the incident that had occurred, they expressed their willingness to Raja Mahadi to help fight against Raja Abdullah. So Raja Mahadi's heart was open to accept the call for war. He was powered by monetary assistance from Melaka Chinese Baba, Tek Cheng.

In March 1867, Raja Mahadi with the help of the Sumatran Malays including the people of Batu Bara successfully defeated Raja Abdullah. Raja Abdullah tried to recapture Klang but was unsuccessful. During the war, Muhamad Akib, the leader of the Batu Bara people, was shot dead and his brother Nonggok (also known as Dato Dagang Muhamad Tahir) replaced his brother as the leader of the Batu Bara people. Muhamad Akib and several of his followers who died were buried in the Kota Raja Mahadi area. The grave is still there until now. Because Raja Mahadi failed to fulfill his promise to give power to Muhamad Akib and Muhamad Tahir (as successors to his deceased brother) most of the districts of Selangor as a reward for supporting Raja Mahadi in defeating Raja Abdullah in Klang, a dispute occurred between Muhamad Tahir and Raja Mahadi. Furthermore, one of Muhamad Tahir's followers was killed by a brother of Raja Mahadi, which Raja Mahadi refused to settle or pay compensation to Muhamad Tahir. Therefore, Muhamad Tahir felt angry and dissatisfied and subsequently withdrew his support from Raja Mahadi and instead sided with Tengku Kudin until the end of the Klang War.

=== As Orang Besar Daerah Klang ===
After taking control of Klang , Raja Mahadi stopped paying Sultan Abdul Samad $500 as Raja Abdullah had done. This stoppage caused Sultan Abdul Samad to break off Raja Mahadi's engagement to his daughter, Raja Arfah.

In 1868, Sultan Abdul Samad married his daughter, Raja Arfah, to Tengku Kudin (Tengku Dhiauddin; younger brother of Sultan Ahmad Tajuddin Mukarram Shah) from Kedah. Sultan Abdul Samad also appointed Tengku Kudin as the administrator of the Langat district. Tengku Kudin attempted to be a peacemaker. However, Tengku Kudin's efforts were rejected by Raja Mahadi. Tengku Kudin was offended and chose to help Raja Ismail, Raja Abdullah's son, who led a group against Raja Mahadi after Raja Abdullah's death.

In 1869, Raja Mahdi as chief of Klang, appointed Yap Ah Loy as Kapitan of Kuala Lumpur. However, Yap Ah Loy defected and supported Raja Ismail and Tengku Kudin after they succeeded in controlling Klang. Later in August, Raja Ismail , leading a force of 100 men, attacked Klang and captured the city on the lower Klang River. This attack began a siege of Klang with the help of Muhamad Tahir and the Batu Bara people that lasted for 6 months. Soon after, Raja Ismail's forces were aided by 500 Kedah men brought by Tengku Kudin. This aid gave Raja Ismail an advantage and caused Raja Mahadi to retreat from Klang in March 1870.

In 1872, Raja Mahdi gained the support of several Malay chiefs, some of them members of the royal family of Selangor. Raja Asal and Sutan Puasa – the leaders of Mandailing diaspora in Selangor – also pledged their allegiance to Raja Mahdi. Raja Mahdi successfully captured Kuala Lumpur, with Raja Asal laying siege to Bukit Nanas, where Tengku Kudin's forces of 500 soldiers and European mercenaries were stationed.

Between 1872 and 1873, with the help of the Sultan Ahmad Muʽazzam, Raja bendahara of Pahang, a group of Pahang soldiers led by Rasu bin Shahrom descended on Selangor and immediately defeated Raja Mahadi's forces. Raja Bendahara supported Tengku Kudin after him counter offer Raja Mahadi in obtaining their assistance.

After British intervention in 1874 Raja Mahadi was arrested and imprisoned in Singapore in 1875, alongside Sultan Puasa.

== Deceased ==
He was released and began living in Singapore as an exile. Raja Mahadi was given a house and a monthly pension by the British. Seven years later, he died in Singapore on 10 January 1882 of tuberculosis and was buried in Bukit Mahmoodiah, Johor Bahru.

== Legacy ==
A school in Klang and a street in Kuala Lumpur have been named after him.

- SMK Raja Mahadi
- Jalan Raja Mahadi, Kampung Baru
