= State visit by Emmanuel Macron to Malaysia =

2026 state visit by President of France

- Date: 16 to 17 November 2026
- Location: Kuala Lumpur, Malaysia
- Type: State visit
- Participants: President Emmanuel Macron; Brigitte Macron; Prime Minister Anwar Ibrahim; Wan Azizah Wan Ismail

French President Emmanuel Macron and his wife, Brigitte, visited Malaysia from 16 to 17 November 2026. They were welcomed by Anwar Ibrahim and Wan Azizah Wan Ismail at Sultan Abdul Samad Building. This was the first state visit to Malaysia by a French president since 2017 and the first by a European Union leader since European Council president António Costa.

During the visit, Macron and Anwar formalised the elevation of Malaysia–France relations to a Strategic Partnership.

== Background ==
In July 2025, Anwar Ibrahim had paid an official visit to France, which was described as a diplomatic success in helping to reviving partnerships across all sectors.

Macron's visit to Malaysia was seen as a further effort by the Second Lecornu government to strengthen links with a non-NATO/Western ally, against a background of uncertainty about negotiations over Iran and the threat of tariffs from the United States, as well as efforts to securing supply of rare earth materials from beyond China's oversight. Anwar's office said the visit was realised "only because of Macron, otherwise it's not possible" as a sign of the close personal relationship between the leaders of Malaysia and France, while Macron hailed the improved bilateral ties as an important step forward for both countries in reducing dependence on major global powers on Facebook. The Malaysian prime minister had earlier flew back from the 49th ASEAN Summit in Pasay to host Macron and resumed his itinerary in the Philippines upon the conclusion of his meeting with the French president.

== Programme ==
=== 16 November: Arrival ===
On 16 November, Macron and his wife Brigitte were greeted off the presidential plane at Kuala Lumpur International Airport's Bunga Raya Complex by Gobind Singh Deo, Minister of Digital, and his spouse Sangeta Kaur Sidhu. Macron arrived in Malaysia following a three-day state visit to Cambodia, where he attended the 20th Francophonie Summit in Phnom Penh.

=== 17 November: Met PM Anwar, state luncheon and Kuala Lumpur heritage walk ===
The Prime Minister and his spouse formally welcomed the President and First Lady at Sultan Abdul Samad Building, where Macron reviewed a military guard of honour. The ceremony at Dataran Merdeka, attended by deputy prime ministers Ahmad Zahid Hamidi and Fadillah Yusof, featured national anthems by the Royal Malay Regiment band and a 106-member guard of honour.

Following this, Macron and Anwar held bilateral talks, elevating Malaysia–France relations to a Strategic Partnership and signing MoUs on defence, semiconductors, critical minerals, and energy transition.

Concurrently, Wan Azizah Wan Ismail and Hannah Yeoh accompanied Brigitte Macron on a tour of the Merdeka Textile Museum at Merdeka 118, where she viewed traditional textiles like songket and tried Kelantanese Kelingkan embroidery. An official luncheon followed, hosted by Anwar.

In the afternoon, Macron, Anwar, and Yeoh took a walking tour of historic Kuala Lumpur—visiting the River of Life, Central Market, Petaling Street, Sin Sze Si Ya Temple, Guan Di Temple, and Sri Mahamariamman Temple. Macron then departed from the Bunga Raya Complex at Kuala Lumpur International Airport aboard the presidential Airbus A330-223 (F-RARF, call sign Cotam Unité) at 6:05 pm, inspected by a Royal Ranger Regiment guard of honour and seen off by Gobind.

== See also ==
- List of international presidential trips made by Emmanuel Macron
