= Kota Raja Mahadi =

Coordinates: 3°2′42.7″N 101°26′41.6″E

Raja Mahadi Fort
- Kota Raja Mahadi (in Malay)
- Klang, Malaysia
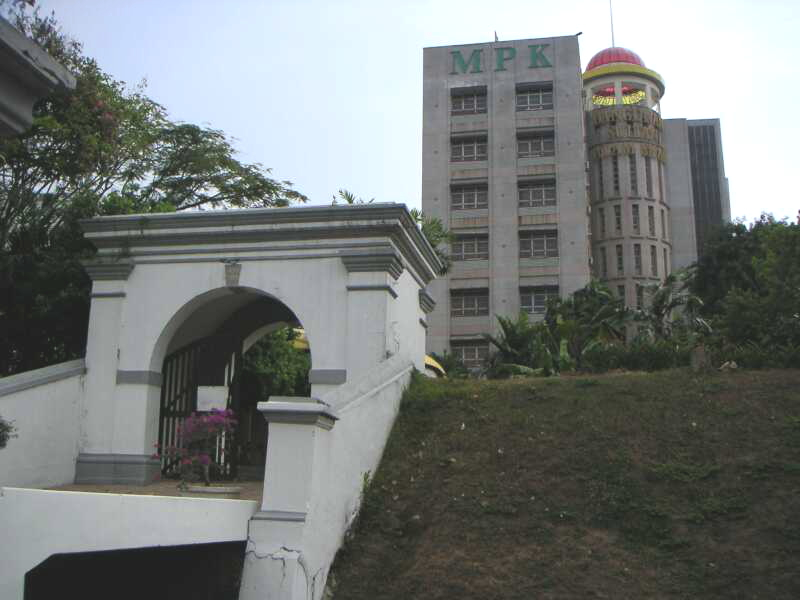
- Gate of Kota Raja Mahdi, built in 1860

Site information
- Open to the public: Yes

Site history
- Built: 1860
- Built by: Raja Mahadi
- In use: 1860-1898

Garrison information
- Past commanders: Raja Mahadi; Tengku Kudin

Kota Raja Mahadi is a Malaysian historic defensive fort built by Raja Mahadi on top of Bukit Kota, Klang, Selangor, built in 1860.It was used as the main battle station for him during the Selangor civil war against Raja Abdullah bin Raja Jaafar and later Tengku Kudin.

== History ==
Immediately after Raja Mahadi was driven out in 1870, the fort was taken over by his rival, Tengku Kudin (the Viceroy of Selangor). He used the fort as his primary residence and administrative base in Klang until approximately 1898. During this period, it served as a symbol of the new political order established after the Selangor Civil War (Klang War).

In 1899, the cannons that once defended the fort were moved to decorate the Istana Mahkota Puri.

== Structure ==
The fort was strategically positioned on a hill overlooking the Klang River to monitor and defend the important waterway. The main gate was built later, in 1871; only the gate of the fort now remains. The site of the fort (Bukit Kota) eventually became the location for the Klang Royal City Council building.

In 2019, the old staircase in front of the fort was discovered.

== Features ==
- Gate of the fort
- The grave of Muhammad Akib, leader of the Batu Bara, allies of Raja Mahadi during Selangor civil war
