= Syed Mashhor =

19th century Malay rebel

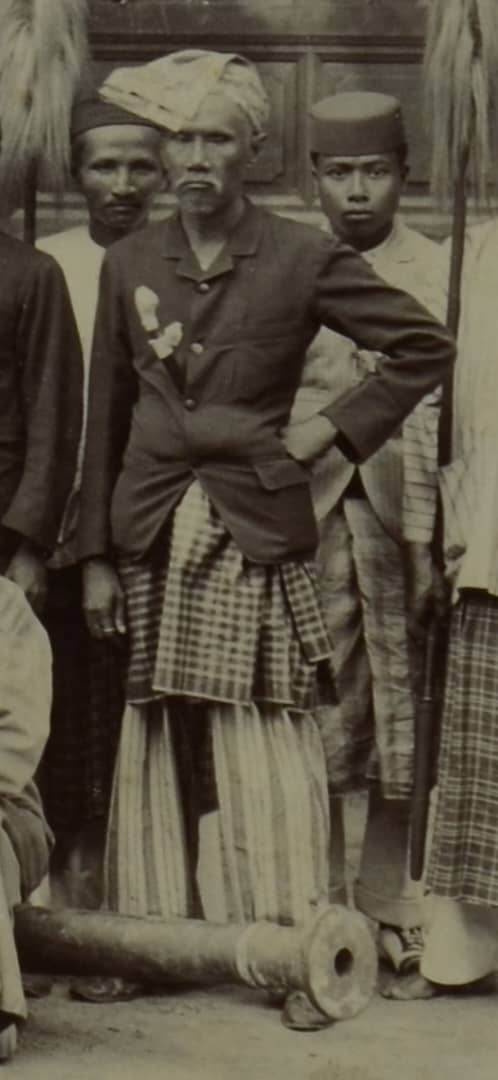
Syed Mashhor

Syed Mashhor bin Syed Muhammad Ash-Sahab, also written as Syed Masahor was born in Langat. His father Syed Muhammad Ash-Sabab is of Arab descent from Pontianak (West Kalimantan). Syed Mashhor was a cousin of Sultan Abdul Samad on his mother's side. During the outbreak of the Klang War, he was in Perlis visiting his family.

The Klang War was between Raja Mahadi, Raja Mahmud and Syed Mashhor who were supported by tin miners from the Ghee Hin secret society, who were opponents to another faction that consisted of Tengku Kudin (the viceroy of Yamtuan), Yap Ah Loy who were supported by troops from Pahang and tin miners from Hai San.

== Early conflict ==
Syed Mashhor was a famous warrior and experienced soldier and was invited by Sultan Abdul Samad to be the head of the defense of Kuala Selangor under the care of Raja Musa. Syed Mashhor was tasked by His Majesty the Sultan to take back the district of Kuala Selangor that had fallen into the hands of Raja Mahadi. Syed Mashhor initially accepted the Sultan of Selangor's request and led an army to attack Kuala Selangor but the news of the death of his brother, Syed Abdullah in Langat caused him to defect and side with Raja Mahadi. Syed Mashhor suspected and accused Sultan Abdul Samad's son, Raja Yaakob as being complicit in the death of his brother. Syed Mashhor later played an important role and became the commander of Raja Mahadi's forces in the Klang War. His role in this war began when his followers together with Chong the leader of the Ghee Hin attacked the Mandailings and Fel Chow Chinese in Sungai Ampang and Klang between August and September 1870 until the end of the war.

== Capture of Kuala Lumpur and Kuala Selangor ==
Syed Mashhor, in his efforts to help Raja Mahadi had managed to gather 2,000 followers in Hulu Selangor, and in the middle of June 1871, together with Chong, the Chief of the Ghee Hin, advanced towards Kuala Lumpur but were stopped in Rawang by the forces of Tengku Kudin and his supporter Yap Ah Loy, chief of the Hai San clan and caused Syed Mashhor to retreat to Hulu Selangor. Tengku Kudin and Yap Ah Loy successfully captured Kuala Lumpur in August, 1871.

In November, 1871, Syed Mashhor together with 250 of his supporters and a group of Rawa people besieged Tengku Kudin's fort (controlled by Wan Aman from Pahang and his followers) and blocked the supply of food and weapons brought into Kuala Lumpur. In March 1872, Syed Mashhor once again attacked Kuala Lumpur and this time with the help of Raja Mahmud and Raja Mahadi he succeeded in capturing Kuala Lumpur. During the attack, Syed Mashhor killed Van Hagen, the Sepoy Commander hired by Tengku Kudin. Syed Mashhor held Kuala Lumpur until the end of March 1873.

== Defeat and escape ==
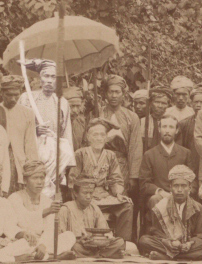
Syed Mashhor (highlighted), Sultan Abdul Samad (seated left) and Acting British Resident J.P. Rodger (seated right) 1884-1888

In March 1873, Raja Mahadi, Syed Mashhor and Raja Mahmud were defeated by Tengku Kudin and an army from Pahang led by Tok Gajah and the Chenor people captured Kuala Lumpur forcing Syed Mashhor to retreat to Hulu Selangor and eventually fled to Perak. Raja Mahadi and Raja Mahmud managed to escape to Sungai Ujong. From that moment Tengku Kudin managed to strengthen his position in Selangor until the end of the Klang War. After the war, Syed Mashhor was considered to be an outlaw by British officers and Sultan Abdul Samad. While in Perak Syed Mashhor initially sided with Sultan Abdullah in the pact to kill JWW Birch but later left the pact shortly before the assassination. This was acknowledged by Birch himself shortly before his death. He continued to help the British to restore order in Perak.

== Return to Selangor ==
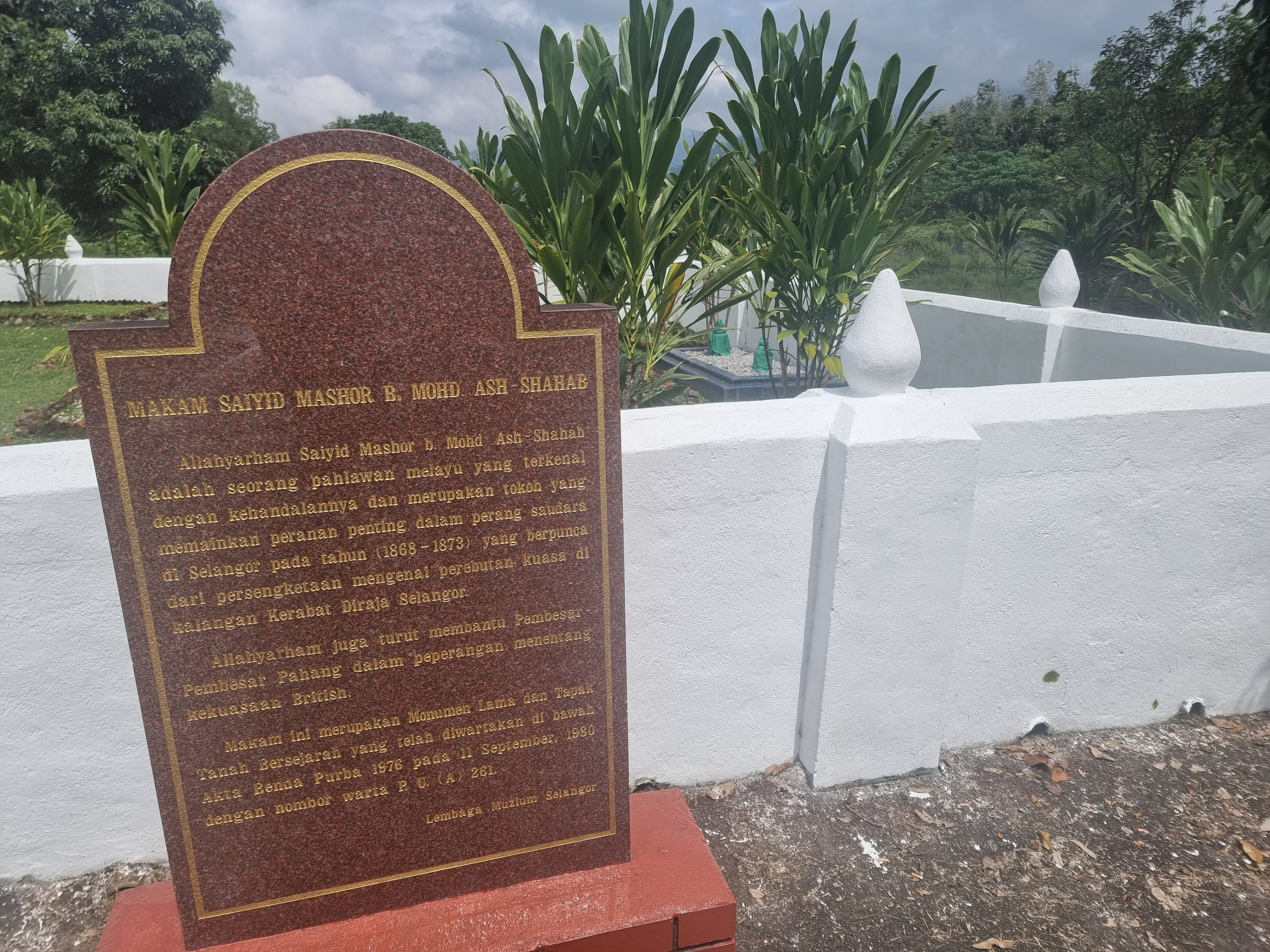
Grave of Syed Mashor - Ulu Kerling

Syed Mashhor also, later successfully reconnected with Sultan Abdul Samad and regained his favour. On 23 June 1883, Sultan Abdul Samad sent a letter to Frank Swettenham to offer Syed Mashhor a job and an allowance to serve in Selangor. Syed Mashhor was appointed as Penghulu Ulu Kerling on 12 December 1883. Syed Mashhor proved his abilities while serving as Penghulu Ulu Kerling. In a short time he managed to develop Ulu Kerling through the opening of tin mines using Chinese miners as well as opening new lands. During the outbreak of resistance against the British in Pahang (Pahang Rebellion 1891–1895) led by Dato' Bahaman, Syed Mashhor helped the British to eliminate the resistance. Syed Mashhor retired as Penghulu Ulu Kerling on 1 February 1899.

== See also ==
- Klang War
