= Gedung Raja Abdullah =

Raja Abdullah warehouse
- Gedung Raja Abdullah (in Malay)
- Klang, Malaysia

Site information
- Open to the public: Yes

Location
- Coordinates: 3.04343°N 101.44753°E

Site history
- Built: 1856
- Built by: Raja Abdullah bin Raja Jaafar

Garrison information
- Past commanders: Raja Abdullah bin Raja Jaafar; Raja Mahadi

Gedung Raja Abdullah is Selangor's oldest building.

== History ==
It was constructed in 1856. Raja Abdullah, who was made Chief of Klang by Sultan Muhammad Shah of Selangor, built it as his house (on the first floor) and store (for supplies, tin, and mining equipment). By being situated so near with Port Pengkalan Batu, it also store tin ore mined from surrounded area. It was modeled after the Lukut residence of his father.

It was taken over by the police in the 1880s until 1974. Iron grille doors were added to various rooms, which became cells.

Gedung Raja Abdullah was conserved by Badan Warisan Malaysia in 1984, and in 1985, it was reopened as the State Museum's Muzium Timah.

Around 2016, the building were closed from the public.

In April 2026, the Selangor state government announced that Gedung Raja Abdullah would be relocated from its original site near Jambatan Tengku Kelana to a new location in Taman Bandar Diraja Klang, adjacent to the Tugu Keris and reopened as a tin museum.

== Design ==
The architectural style of Gedung Raja Abdullah portrays a hybrid architectural infusion of several architectural influences, namely, the Dutch-colonial, Vernacular and Bugis architecture. Overall, the Dutch Colonial influence dominated the architectural design of Gedung Raja Abdullah, with its simple and without carving details at both windows and doors, column style, gable roof, thick stone wall, and building orientation. Besides that, the local Malay Vernacular are displayed through the use of locally available building materials, such as stones and sands from Klang river and eggs, the usage of traditional Malay Wooden Tanggam joinery methods; timber framed thatched pitched roof; wooden windows and doors panels; including traditional Malay staircase railings design. The Bugis influence can be seen through the original open plan of the residential space planning of Gedung Raja Abdullah at the upper floor.
