= Klang War =

Conflict in Selangor, Malaysia (1867–1874)

Date	1866–1874
Location	Selangor
Result	Tengku Kudin faction victory: Beginning of British residency of Selangor; Selangor became part of the Federated Malay States in 1895

Belligerents
Raja Abdullah loyalist; Pahang Kingdom; Tengku Kudin faction; Hai San; Supported by: Sultan of Selangor; United Kingdom (from 1873); Foreign mercenaries; Kingdom of Italy; Netherlands (Note: Around 20 of these officers were of Eurasian descent)	(Selangor) Raja Mahadi loyalists; Sumatran groups; Ghee Hin; Supported by: (Selangor) Local Malay chiefs

Commanders and leaders
Raja Abdullah; Raja Ismail; Tengku Kudin; Mohamed Tahir; Yap Ah Loy; A. M. de Fontaine	Raja Mahadi; Raja Mahmud; Syed Mashhor; Chong Chong (KIA)

The Klang War or Selangor Civil War was a series of conflicts that lasted from 1866 to 1874 in the Malay state of Selangor in the Malay Peninsula (modern-day Malaysia).

It was initially fought between Raja Abdullah, the administrator of the Klang Valley, and Raja Mahadi. It was joined by Tengku Kudin (Tengku Dhiauddin, also spelt Ziauddin), a Kedahan prince, as well as other Malay and Chinese factions. The war was eventually won by Tengku Kudin and Abdullah's son, Raja Ismail.

== Background ==
In 1854, the sultan of Selangor Sultan Muhammad Shah appointed Raja Abdullah bin Raja Ja'afar as governor of the Klang Valley. Raja Abdullah and his brother Raja Juma'at had previously helped Raja Sulaiman settle a debt incurred during a failed mining venture, and was rewarded with the governorship of the Klang Valley. Raja Mahadi, the grandson of Sultan Muhammad Shah, was the son of Raja Sulaiman who previously served as governor of the Klang Valley; Raja Abdullah's appointment to the post therefore also disinherited Raja Mahdi of the position, which resulted in his resentment.

Raja Abdullah and Raja Juma'at, who had opened very successful tin mines in Lukut (near modern Port Dickson, Negeri Sembilan), obtained funding for the exploration of new tin mines near Kuala Lumpur, at the confluence of the Klang and Gombak rivers, in 1857. The new mines were successful, generating considerable revenue, and the struggle for the control of the revenue, as well as for political power, were essentially the reasons for the war.

The Klang Valley, shaded in deep pink, within modern borders of Selangor

Sultan Muhammad died in 1857, and Sultan Abdul Samad succeeded him after a power struggle. Sultan Abdul Samad however only had direct control over the state capital, Langat, and did not have absolute control over the rest of Selangor, which was organized into four riverine provinces – the Bernam Valley, Kuala Selangor, the Klang Valley, and Lukut – which were administered by four autonomous chieftains or governors. When the disgruntled Raja Mahadi initiated the conflict, the Malays were split into two camps in the ensuing war. On Raja Mahadi's side were Raja Mahmud, son of the Panglima Raja of Selangor; Raja Hitam of the Bernam Valley; as well as Sumatran immigrants led by Mohamed Akib and his younger brother Mohamed Tahir (later conferred the title of 'Dato Dagang'). Raja Abdullah's faction included his son, Raja Ismail who continued the war after Raja Abdullah's death, later joined by the Kedahan prince, Tengku Kudin and supported by Sultan Abdul Samad. The Chinese tin miners were also divided between the two camps.

Some of the Malays however switched sides in the course of the war, for example Mohamed Tahir, who helped Raja Mahadi take Klang from Raja Abdullah, eventually switched to Tengku Kudin's side. Syed Mashhor, an Arab-Malay fighter whose father was from Pontianak, was born in Langat, Selangor. He initially supported Raja Abdullah's cause but switched to that of Raja Mahdi. Raja Muda Musa of Kuala Selangor also went over to Raja Mahdi's side.

In the later stages of the conflict Tengku Kudin managed to gain the support of British colonial administrators and in 1873 mercenaries from neighbouring Pahang.

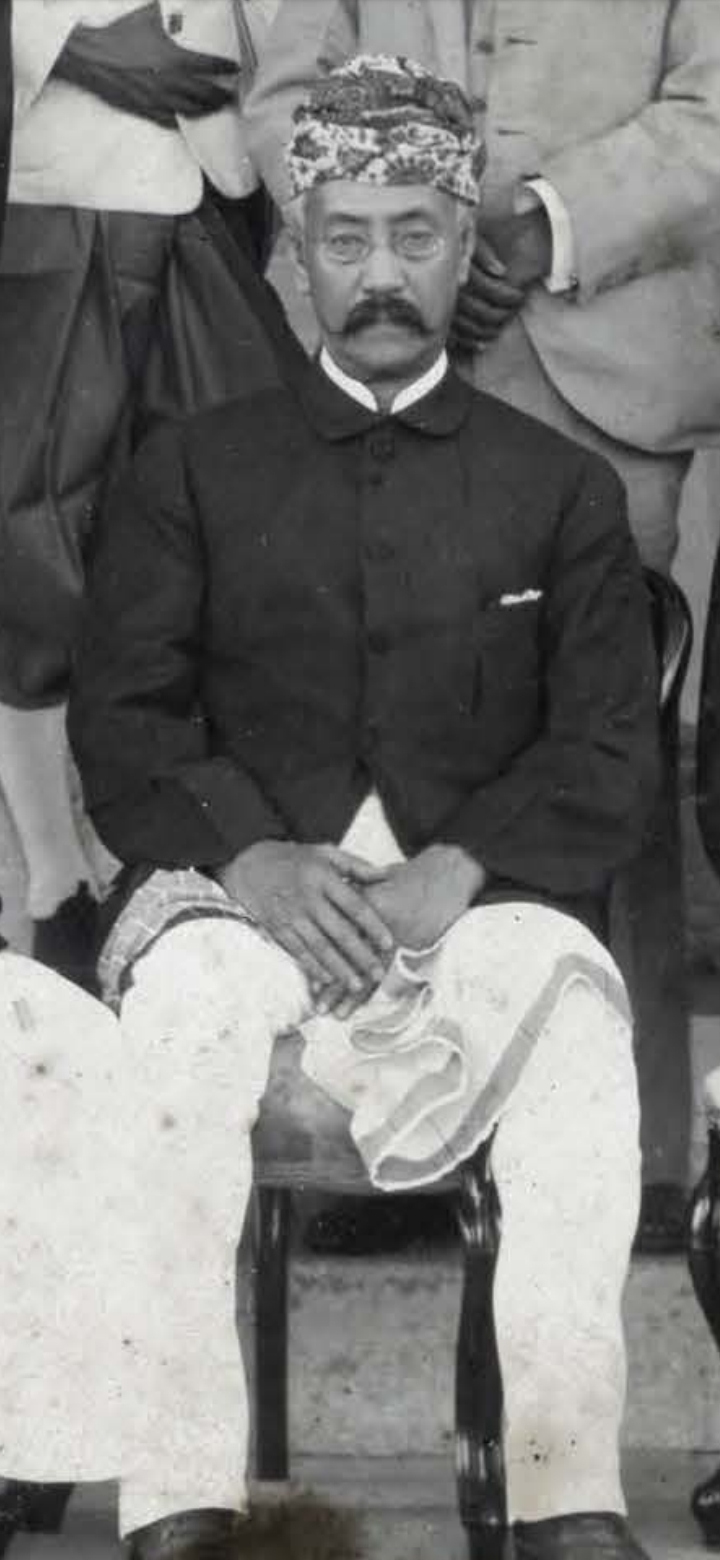
Tengku Kudin

== Initial conflict ==
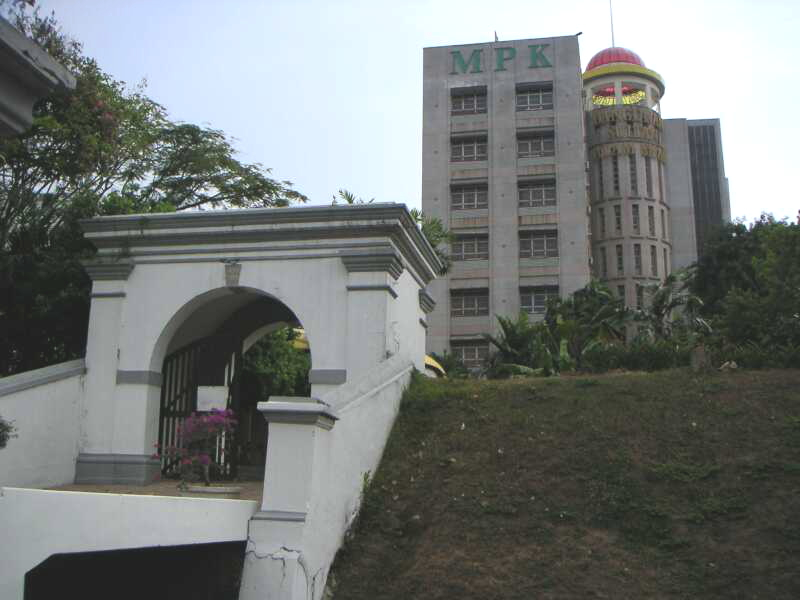
The entrance gate of the old Kota Raja Mahadi in Klang, built in 1866 as a defense against Raja Abdullah. Today only the main gate and the earthen ramparts remain of the fort.

In 1866, Raja Abdullah authorised two traders from the Straits Settlements – William Henry Macleod Read and Tan Kim Ching – to collect taxes from the opium trade in the Klang Valley, which Raja Mahdi was also involved in. Raja Mahdi objected to the tax collection, on the grounds that he should be exempted as he was Selangorean royalty, and refused to pay. Raja Abdullah saw this as an act of defiance by Raja Mahdi towards him. This incident, exacerbated by Raja Mahdi's continued dissatisfaction with being ignored as the successor to Sultan Muhammad for the Selangorean throne following his death in 1857, in favour of Raja Abdul Samad (later became Sultan Abdul Samad), as well as further conflicts between their followers, worsened the already tense relationship between the two princes, which many believe were the initial causes for the outbreak of the Klang War.

At that time there was also a long-standing animosity between the Bugis Malays (the royal family of Selangor were of Bugis origin) and the Batu Bara clan who are of Sumatran origin. Raja Abdullah, himself a Bugis, refused to punish a fellow member of the Bugis clan he had sent to guard Bukit Nanas in Kuala Lumpur (the site of the modern Kuala Lumpur Tower), who murdered a villager from the Batu Bara clan. Angered by Raja Abdullah's refusal to punish the murderer or paying compensation for the death of one of his men as an alternative, the Batu Bara clan leader, Mohamed Akib, informed Raja Mahdi of the incident and pledged his support for him if he wanted to fight against Raja Abdullah. Raja Mahdi, supported by some Sumatran traders, then laid siege to the fort of Klang town (now known as Kota Raja Mahadi). Mohamad Akib was shot and killed in 1867 while attempting an assault at the fort, and his younger brother Mohamed Tahir assumed leadership of the Batu Bara clan. Mohamad Akib's body together with several other slain Sumatran Malays were buried within the grounds of the fort.

Raja Abdullah evacuated with his family to the Straits Settlement of Malacca, where he later died, while his two sons, Raja Ismail and Raja Hasan, continued fighting. In March 1867, Raja Mahdi captured the fort of Klang, taking the city. One of Abdullah's sons, Raja Ismail, returned with three small ships to lay siege to Klang City, but was unable to retake it.

== Chinese Kongsi Involvement ==
When the Selangor Civil War broke out, Kapitan Cina of Kuala Lumpur Yap Ah Loy was faced with internecine fighting among dissident Chinese groups as well as attacks from other Malay factions. The two largest Chinese gangs, the Kuala Lumpur-based Hai San and the Selayang-based Ghee Hin, had engaged in fighting to gain control of tin production in the town. The Chinese factions would eventually join opposing sides in the civil war, with the Ghee Hin siding with Raja Mahadi, and the Hai San with Yap Ah Loy siding with Tengku Kudin.

At Kanching (near Selayang), the headman Yap Ah Sze, who was an ally of Yap Ah Loy, was murdered, most likely at the instigation of Chong Chong, another Hakka headman. Yap Ah Loy, the Chinese Kapitan of Kuala Lumpur, went to Kanching with his men to drive out Chong Chong, and many from the Kanching faction were killed. Chong Chong then took refuge in Rawang and joined Raja Mahdi's faction.

Yap Ah Loy initially stayed neutral in the Klang War, choosing to deal with whoever that was in power. After Raja Mahdi took Klang City, he had in fact scheduled a ceremony to formally invest Yap into the office of Kapitan in 1869. However, when Klang City was captured by Tengku Kudin, Yap recognized Tengku Kudin's authority, after meeting him by chance in Langat, earning him the enmity of Raja Mahdi. Chong Chong soon joined Syed Mashhor on two failed offensives on Kuala Lumpur.

== Tengku Kudin enters the war ==
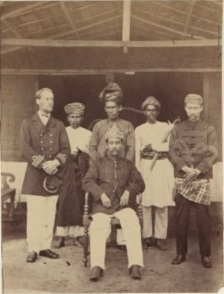
Tengku Kudin and Raja Ismail with Captain Powlett. H.M.S. "Avon".

In 1867, Tengku Kudin, a prince from Kedah (then part of Siam), married into the royal family of Selangor. Sultan Abdul Samad then appointed his son-in-law as Viceroy of Selangor with a mandate to carry out mediation between the warring parties, first on 26 June 1868.

Raja Mahdi however rejected the mediation. Offended, Tengku Kudin opted to back Raja Ismail.

Simultaneously, cracks emerge between Raja Mahdi and his former ally, Mohamed Tahir, leader of the Batu Bara clan. Raja Mahdi had earlier promised Tahir the governorship in the interior provinces of Selangor, in exchange for Tahir's assistance in his offensive on Klang City. However, he reneged on his offer after his victory in Klang in March 1867. To make things worse, a relative of Raja Mahdi had killed one of the clan leader's followers in a scuffle. Tahir demanded for justice according to the Malay custom of adat ganti darah (blood money), but Raja Mahdi ignored his demand. Tahir soon withdrew his support for Raja Mahdi, and offered Tengku Kudin his allegiance, which Tengku Kudin accepted. Tahir also informed Tengku Kudin (and Sultan Abdul Samad) that he was able, through his contacts in Singapore, to supply them with weapons and ammunition in their fight against Raja Mahdi.

In March 1870, Raja Ismail, assisted by Tengku Kudin, laid siege to Klang City and drove out Raja Mahdi, who retreated north to Kuala Selangor which he had captured from Raja Musa with help from Raja Hitam. Syed Mashhor, then serving under Tengku Kudin, was deployed to Kuala Selangor to assist Raja Musa but defected upon learning that his brother had been killed by a son of Sultan Abdul Samad. Raja Mahdi and his Chinese allies from Selayang who were enemies of Yap, unsuccessfully mounted an offensive on Kuala Lumpur in 1870, with support from Malay troops led by Syed Mashhor. Another offensive the following year also failed.

Meanwhile, the conflict disrupted the economy and trade with the British Straits Settlements, while also raising concerns over security, especially with the occurrence of piracy. The British soon increasingly involved themselves in the affairs of Selangor. In July 1871, a pirate attack on ships was traced to Raja Mahdi's stronghold in Kuala Selangor. The British soon captured Kuala Selangor in an expedition, driving out Mahdi's men out and giving the town to Tengku Kudin. Kudin however refused to surrender the province to Raja Musa who was the governor, which prompted Raja Musa to join Raja Mahdi's side. Sultan Abdul Samad, who had bestowed the governorship of the Langat province upon Tengku Kudin to help him fund his war, also began to be concerned about the rising influence of Tengku Kudin.

== End of war ==
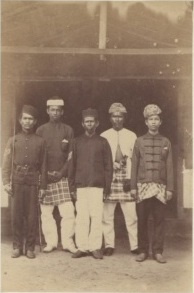
Tengku Dhiauddin's Secretariat

In 1872, Raja Mahdi gained the support of several Malay chiefs, some of them members of the royal family of Selangor. Raja Asal and Sutan Puasa – the leaders of Mandailing diaspora in Selangor – also pledged their allegiance to Raja Mahdi. Raja Mahdi successfully captured Kuala Lumpur, with Raja Asal laying siege to Bukit Nanas, where Tengku Kudin's forces of 500 soldiers and European mercenaries were stationed. Some of Tengku Kudin's men attempted a breakthrough, but they were captured in Petaling and killed. Yap Ah Loy managed to escape to Klang, but Kuala Lumpur was razed to the ground and Kuala Selangor was recaptured by Raja Mahdi's forces.

Yap, however, was determined to regain Kuala Lumpur, and assembled a force of around 1,000 men. Tengku Kudin requested for assistance from the Sultan of neighbouring Pahang, with the Bendahara Wan Ahmad of Pahang providing him 1,000 men and other reservists. He also gained the support of the British colonial administrator Sir Andrew Clarke. In March 1873, Kudin's men, supported by Pahangese fighters, defeated Syed Mashhor in Kuala Lumpur, and Mashhor fled to Perak. The fighting continued for a few more months, but on 8 November 1873 the Pahangese forces captured Kuala Selangor and the war largely ended. In 1874 Raja Mahdi went into exile in Johor and then Singapore, where he died in 1882.

== Aftermath ==
Klang War Conflict Relationship Map: Factions, alliances, and key events

Despite winning the war, Tengku Kudin was viewed with suspicion by the royal family of Selangor. His Pahangese allies also refused to return to Pahang because they wanted a share of tax revenue as "payment" for their service, and their refusal to withdraw complicated the situation. The commander of the Pahangese expeditionary forces was authorised to collect revenue in the provinces of Kuala Selangor and Klang, while J. G. Davidson and others who assisted Tengku Kudin were given favourable concessions on mining land for ten years in Selangor. While the British through the new governor Andrew Clarke backed Tengku Kudin, the post-war situation made his position untenable. Kudin remained the Viceroy of Selangor until 1878, but he had already returned to Kedah by 1876, and later went on to live in Penang.

The war was significant enough that British subjects asked for compensation for their loss of capital invested in Klang. Also, traders from Malacca petitioned the British colonial authorities for their losses incurred during the war.

== British Resident ==
A significant development in this period is the beginning of direct British involvement in the affairs of the Malay states. The British were concerned about the disruption caused by the war to their trade and investments in the region, eventually siding with Tengku Kudin, in part because Raja Mahdi and some of his followers had attacked shipping in the Strait of Malacca. Colonial Secretary James W. W. Birch voiced his support for Tengku Kudin and lent him a ship to blockade Kuala Selangor, and Governor Harry Ord also encouraged Pahang to back Tengku Kudin with fighters. Previously the British had a policy of non-intervention even if they had at times become engaged in local disputes. This war and in particular the Larut War in Perak led to the official abandonment of this policy in September 1873 by the Earl of Kimberley, Secretary of State for the Colonies, and set into motion the beginning of British administration in the Malay States.

In October 1875, Sultan Abdul Samad sent a letter to Andrew Clarke requesting that Selangor become a British protectorate. James Guthrie Davidson, a lawyer from Singapore, was soon appointed as the first British Resident of Selangor. This came after the signing of the 1874 Pangkor Agreement with the Sultan of Perak that marked the beginning of a period of indirect rule of the Malay states by the British Residents serving as advisers to the sultans.

== See also ==
- British Malaya
- Federated Malay States
- Straits Settlement
