= Lumbandolok =

Lumbandolok is a small village in Mandailing Natal Regency in North Sumatra Province. As a Mandailing culture, there are some marga (family clans) that can be found in this village, such as Nasution, Tanjung, Lubis, Batubara, Matondang, Pasaribu and Harahap.

Marga Tanjung has more than ten generations stayed in this village since their ancestor: Pantom Lombu, was invited by the king Nasution to help to protect the village. Nowadays almost 30% of the villagers are marga Tanjung.

"But we still trying to find about who is the father of our ancestor Pantom Lombu and where he came from", said Mr. Turmuzi Tanjung and Mr. Martaon Tanjung, referring to the existence of marga Tanjung in the village.
