= Sutan Puasa =

- Born: Sutan Puasa; 1810; Mandailing Natal Regency, Sumatera
- Died: 14 August 1908 / 16 Rajab 1326 Hijri (aged 98 years old)
- Resting place: Jalan Ampang Muslim Cemetery
- Other name: Sutan Naposo
- Occupations: Entrepreneur, adventurers
- Era: Muhammad Shah of Selangor (Third Sultan of Selangor), Abdul Samad of Selangor (Forth Sultan of Selangor), and Sulaiman of Selangor (Fifth Sultan of Selangor)
- Known for: One of the founder of Kuala Lumpur ,Malaysia

Sutan Puasa (Jawi: سوتن ڤواسا), also known as Sutan Puasa @ Sutan Naposo Bin Raja Ira Koling Bin Sutan Naga Marunding Bin Namora Sende Tua Lubis was a public figure and one of the founders of Kuala Lumpur. He was also known as mining entrepreneur, tin trader and agricultural pioneer.

At his peak, he was known as the richest and most influential man in Kuala Lumpur.

== History ==
Sutan Puasa led Mandailing people to fled to Malaya during the height of Padri War happening at his hometown. He settled down at Ampang Road and invited Hui Siew and Ah Sze Keledek to be a part of early settlers to develop Kuala Lumpur.

Acting as Selangor nobleman, he alongside Raja Billah, collected tax that pass thru Klang River and Gombak River.

In 1869, he supported the appointment of Yap Ah Loy as the third Kapitan of Kuala Lumpur.

Sutan Puasa's residence at Batu 4 1/2, Gombak where he lived before he died in 1908. The house was demolished around 1984.

He played a role of supporting Raja Mahadi during the peak of Klang War. As part of the losing faction, he rfled to Klang.

In 1875, he led a small revolt at Hulu Langat but failed. He was later imprisoned for a year.

He was released and stay at Batu Road for a while. He later moved to Chow Kit Road. He died on 14 Ogos 1908 and was buried at Jalan Ampang Muslim Cemetery.
