= Sin Sze Si Ya Temple =

Taoist temple in Kuala Lumpur, Malaysia

- Malay: Tokong Sin Sze Si Ya; Chinese: 仙四師爺廟
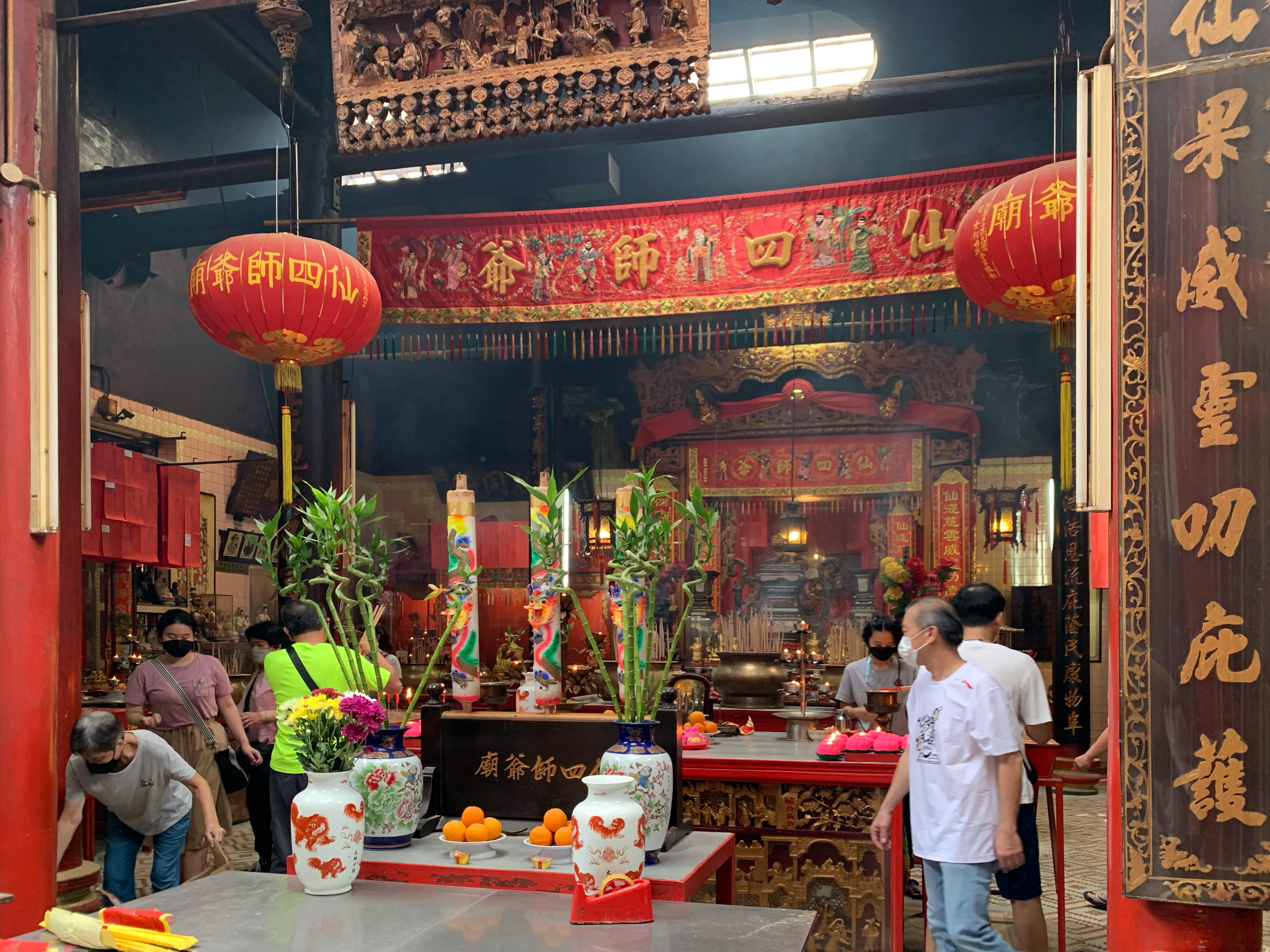
- The temple in 2022

Religion
- Affiliation: Taoism

Location
- Location: Kuala Lumpur
- Country: Malaysia
- Interactive map of Sin Sze Si Ya Temple

Architecture
- Type: Chinese temple
- Founder: Yap Ah Loy
- Established: 1864
- Completed: 1883

Website
- www.sytemple.org

Sin Sze Si Ya Temple
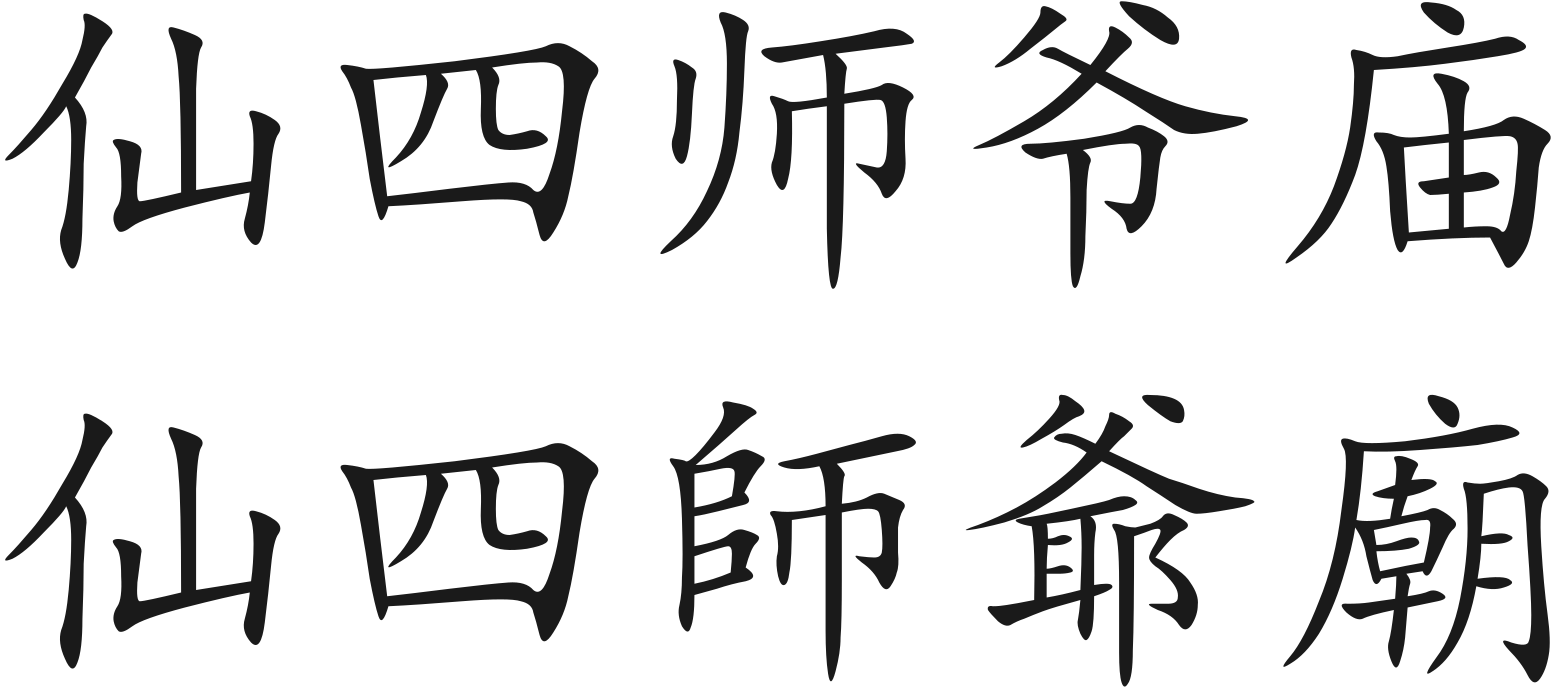
- Sin Sze Si Ya Temple in Simplified Chinese (top) and Traditional Chinese character (bottom)
- Traditional Chinese: 仙四師爺廟
- Simplified Chinese: 仙四师爷庙
Transcriptions
Standard Mandarin
- Hanyu Pinyin: Xiān Sì Shīyé Miào
Hakka
- Romanization: Sien Sii Sii Ya Mieu
- Pha̍k-fa-sṳ: Sien Sii Sii Ya Mieu
Yue: Cantonese
- Yale Romanization: Sīn Seih Sī Yèh Mihuh
- Jyutping: Sin1 sei3 si1 je4 miu6
Southern Min
- Hokkien POJ: Sian-sù-sai-iâ-biō
- Tâi-lô: Sian-sù-sai-iâ-biō

Sin Sze Si Ya Temple (Chinese: 仙四師爺廟; Jyutping: Sin1 sei3 si1 je4 miu6; Pe̍h-ōe-jī: Sian-sù-sai-iâ-biō) (also called as Sze Yah Temple) is a Chinese temple located at 14A Lebuh Pudu, close to the Central Market of Kuala Lumpur, Malaysia. It was built by Yap Ah Loy for two deities he believed guided him in the Selangor Civil War. The temple is the oldest Taoist temple in the city.

== History ==
Kapitan Seng Meng Lee (1822–1860), originally from Huizhou in Guangdong, combined classical learning with martial skills from a young age. After moving to Malacca in 1850, he worked at the Hong Fatt Company, managing the grocery and tin trade. In 1858 he established the Ming Fatt Mining Company in Rasah, Sungai Ujong, where his success as a miner and mediator of disputes earned him recognition as Kapitan of Sungai Ujong.

In 1860, conflict broke out in Sungai Ujong over tin taxes and protection fees, with Chinese factions aligning with rival Malay chieftains. On 26 August 1860, Seng Meng Lee’s forces were defeated; he was captured and killed at the age of 39. Local accounts claim that white blood flowed from his neck when he was executed, interpreted as a divine omen. His followers enshrined him in Rasah’s Qiangu Temple (千古庙), marking the beginning of his deification.

Leadership passed to Yap Ah Loy, Seng’s subordinate, who later became Kapitan of Kuala Lumpur. In 1864, Yap brought Seng’s spirit tablet from Rasah to Kuala Lumpur and initially housed it in a modest wooden shrine, where worshippers claimed that Seng’s spirit offered guidance and protection during times of conflict. By 1873, Yap donated land behind his house for a permanent temple, which was completed in 1875. The new temple honored Seng Meng Lee revered as Sin Sze Ya, as well as Chung Piang Lai, a general under Yap Ah Loy who was known as the “Ever-Victorious General” and later worshipped as Si Sze Ya.

The temple quickly became a center of devotion, with believers crediting the deities’ protection for victories in the Selangor Civil War. It also served as a community hub for dispute settlement, ritual practice, and cultural preservation. Over time, the cult of the two guardian figures spread across Selangor, Negeri Sembilan, and Pahang, where branch temples such as the Kajang Shi Ye Temple and the Bentong Kwong Fook Temple were established.

The building underwent several renovations. Between 1881 and 1883, the temple was reconstructed after fire and flood damage; in 1938 it was again repaired. During the Japanese occupation in World War II, temple activities halted and statues were damaged, but in 1949 the local Chinese community restored the temple, re-consecrated statues, and added a purification hall to memorialize war victims. In 1984, the remains of Seng Meng Lee and his wife were reinterred at Semenyih Kwong Tong Cemetery, accompanied by burial objects such as porcelain cups, a brazier, and ornaments that reflected the daily life of 19th-century Chinese settlers.

In recognition of its cultural and religious importance, the Malaysian government declared the Sin Sze Si Ya Temple a National Heritage Site in 2020 under the National Heritage Act 2005. As the oldest Chinese temple in Kuala Lumpur, it remains both a religious sanctuary and a symbol of the struggles and resilience of the city’s early Chinese immigrant community.
