= Bukit Nanas station =

Monorail station in Kuala Lumpur, Malaysia

MR8 Bukit Nanas
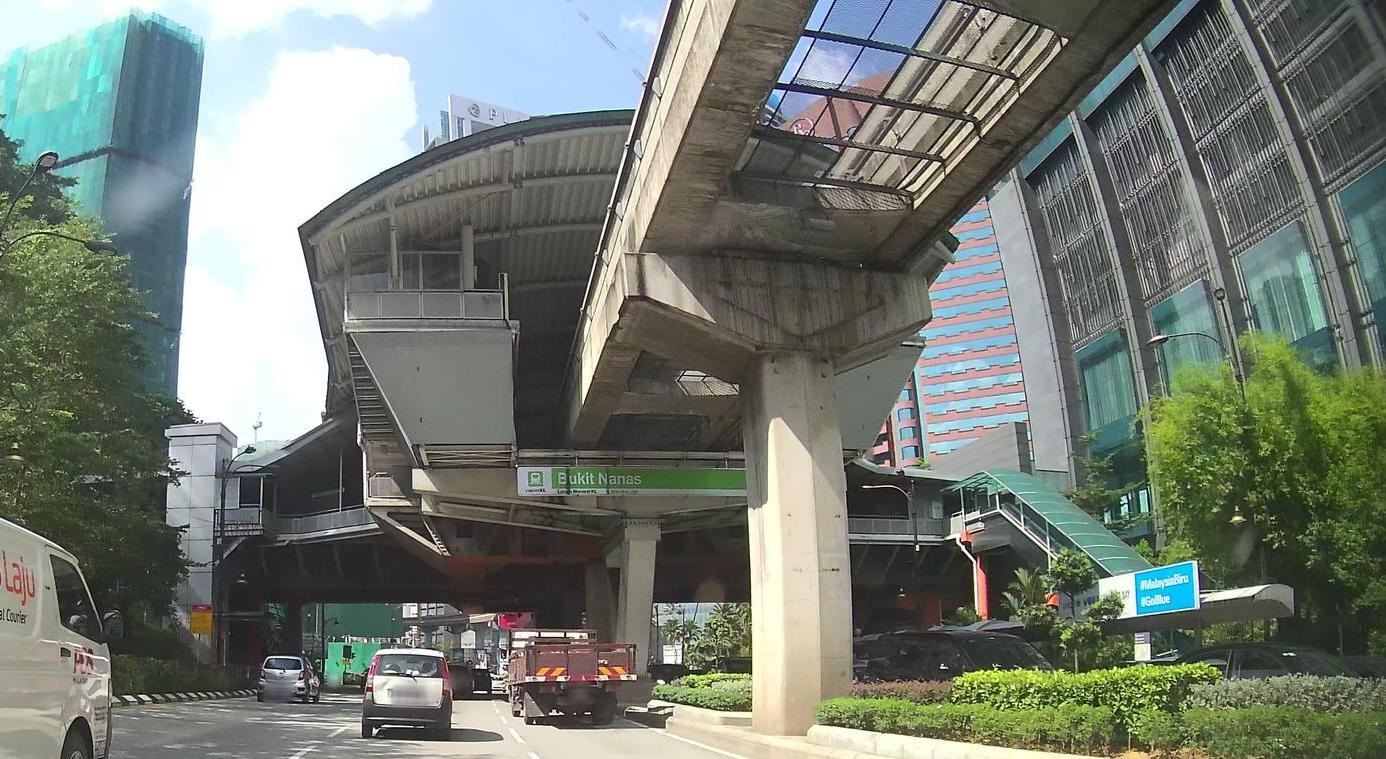
- The exterior of the Bukit Nanas station. Bukit Nanas and the lower portion of the Kuala Lumpur Tower are visible in the background.

General information
- Other names: Malay: بوکيت نانس (Jawi); Chinese: 咖啡山; Tamil: புக்கிட் நானாஸ்
- Location: Jalan Sultan Ismail; 50250 Kuala Lumpur; Malaysia
- Coordinates: 3°9′22″N 101°42′16″E
- System: Rapid KL
- Owner: Prasarana Malaysia
- Operator: Rapid Rail
- Line: 8 KL Monorail
- Platforms: 2 side platforms
- Tracks: 2
- Connections: Connecting station to KJ12 Dang Wangi via a 300 meters canopied sidewalk

Construction
- Structure type: Elevated
- Parking: Not available
- Cycle facilities: Not available
- Accessible: Available

Other information
- Station code: MR8

History
- Opened: 31 August 2003; 22 years ago
- Former names: P. Ramlee

Services
Preceding station		Following station
Raja Chulan towards Kuala Lumpur Sentral	KL Monorail	Medan Tuanku towards Titiwangsa
Location

Bukit Nanas station is a Malaysian elevated monorail train station in Kuala Lumpur that forms part of the Kuala Lumpur Monorail (KL Monorail) line. It opened for train service on 31 August 2003. This station was formerly called P. Ramlee station after the nearby Jalan P. Ramlee.

== Location ==
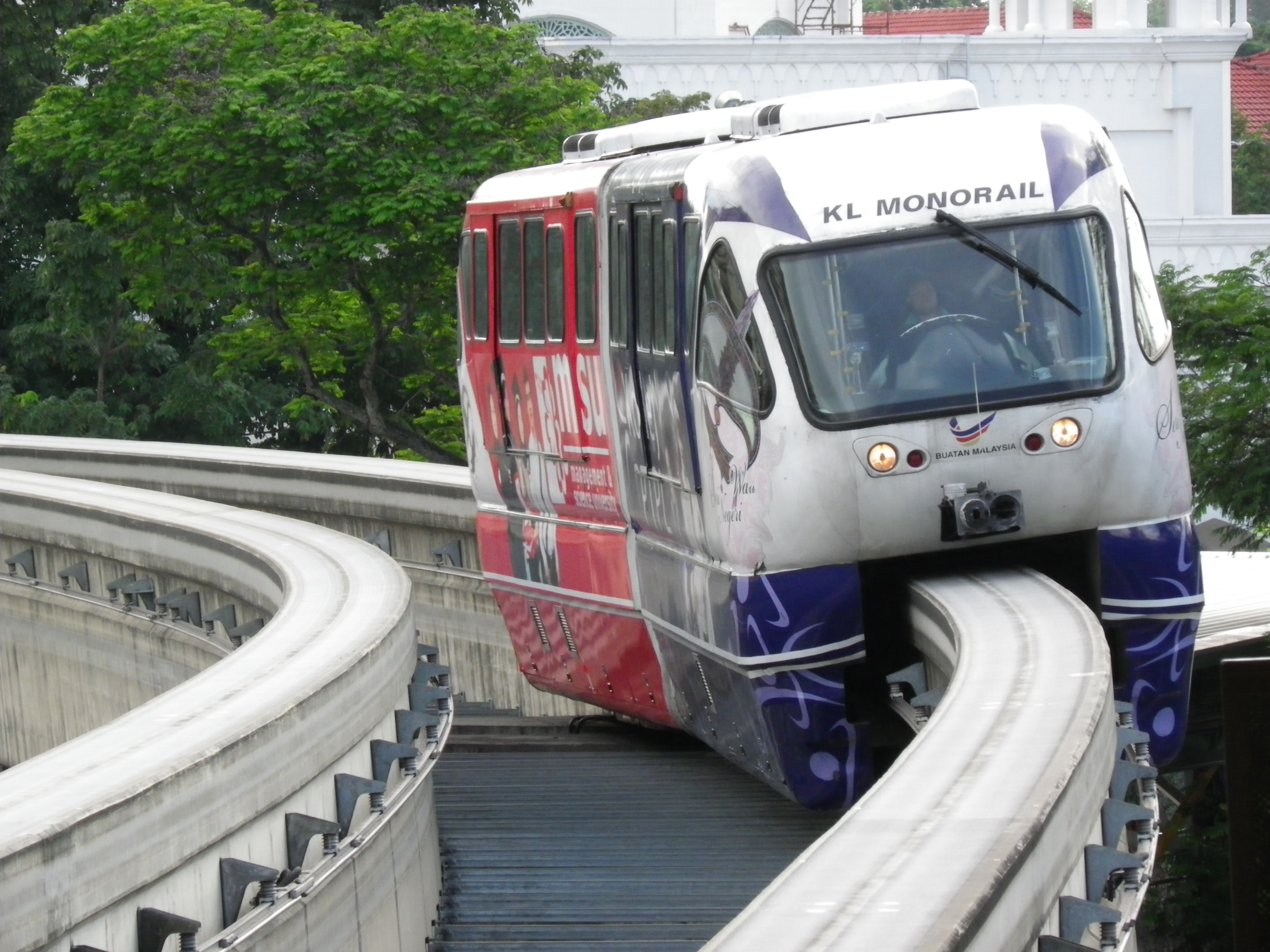
A 2-car KL Monorail train approaching Bukit Nanas station

The station is located at the western tip of Ampang Hilir, constructed near and named after Bukit Nanas, where the Kuala Lumpur Tower, a water treatment plant and a forest reserve are situated. The station is located above Jalan Sultan Ismail, directly south from the Jalan Sultan Ismail-Jalan Ampang intersection.

Due to its location, the station is typically busy during rush hours as well as public holidays, weekends and school holidays when patrons use the monorail to reach the Kuala Lumpur Tower. The station is also situated close to several commercial establishments down the roads.

== Connecting station ==
The Bukit Nanas Monorail station is located 300m from the LRT Kelana Jaya Line's Dang Wangi station via foot along Jalan Ampang; both stations are designated as connecting stations in official transit maps. Covered walkways were erected along Jalan Ampang to and from each station to facilitate commuters transferring between the two lines.

As they are not interchange stations (there is no integration between their respective paid areas), commuters will be charged two single-way journey fares when exiting one station and entering the other.

== Layout ==
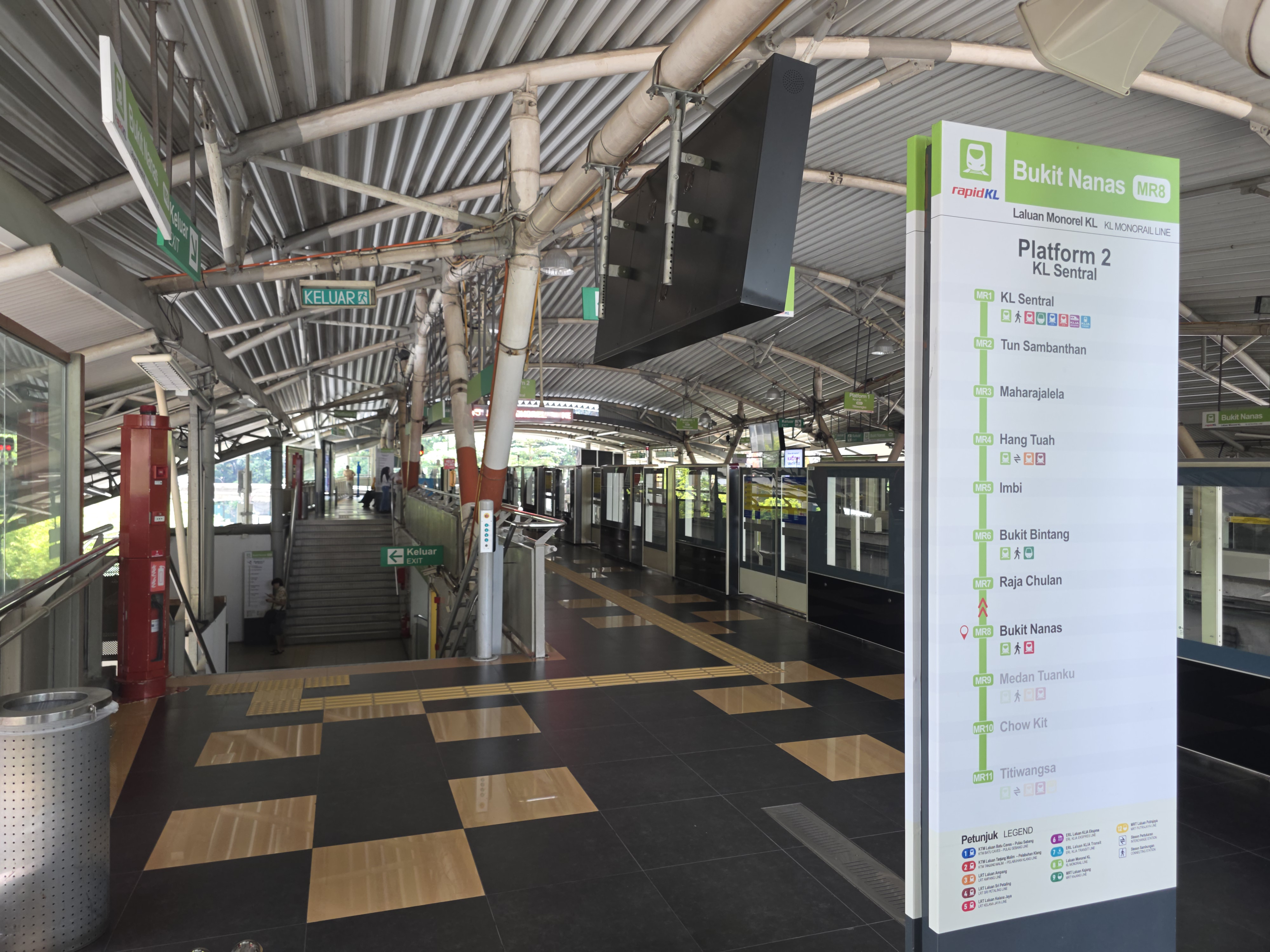
Platform at Bukit Nanas Monorail Station

=== Station layout plan ===
L2	Station Platform Level & Staircase Linkway	Side platform
L2	Station Platform Level & Staircase Linkway	Platform 1 8 KL Monorail towards MR11 Titiwangsa (→)
L2	Station Platform Level & Staircase Linkway	Platform 2 8 KL Monorail towards MR1 KL Sentral (←)
L2	Station Platform Level & Staircase Linkway	Side platform
L1	Station Concourse	Faregates, Ticketing Machines, Monorail Station Control, Concourse Staircase Linkway, Unpaid Area Escalator to/from Street Level
L1	Linkway	Pedestrian walkway to Dang Wangi LRT station
G	Street Level	Jalan Sultan Ismail, Jalan Ampang, Taxi Lay-by
