= Bukit Nanas =

Nature site of Kuala Lumpur, Malaysia

Coordinates: 3°09′10″N 101°42′09″E

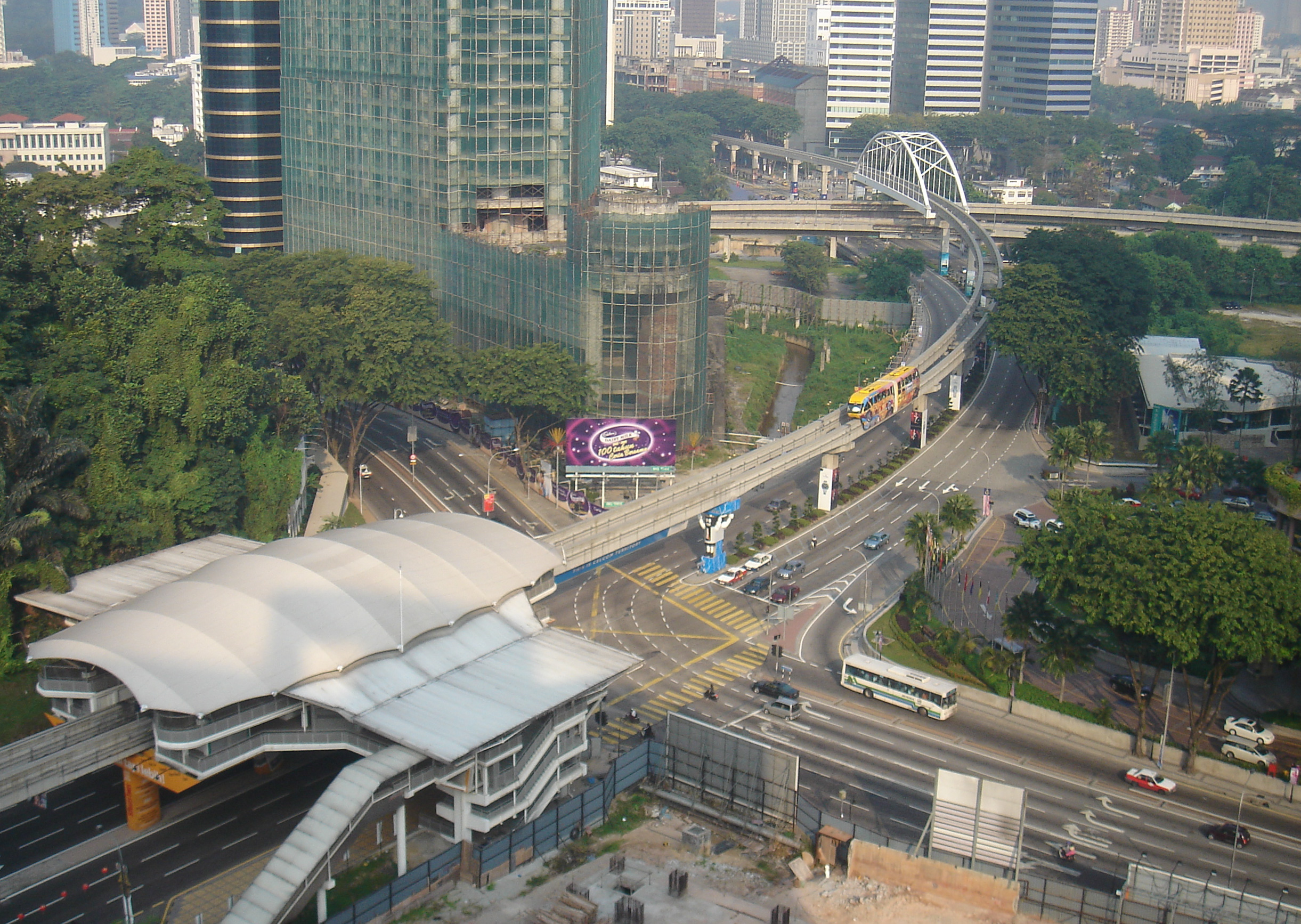
Bukit Nanas station

Bukit Nanas (Weld Hill during colonial rule) is a small hill in Kuala Lumpur, Malaysia. With a height of 94 meters (308 ft) above sea level, it contains the only virgin tropical rain forest left in the heart of Kuala Lumpur. The Bukit Nanas Forest Reserve is located here, and is open to the public. There are jungle trails, a visitors centre, and a forestry museum.

A number of notable buildings, such as the landmark Kuala Lumpur Tower, are located on Bukit Nanas. The area is served by the Bukit Nanas Monorail station.

== History ==
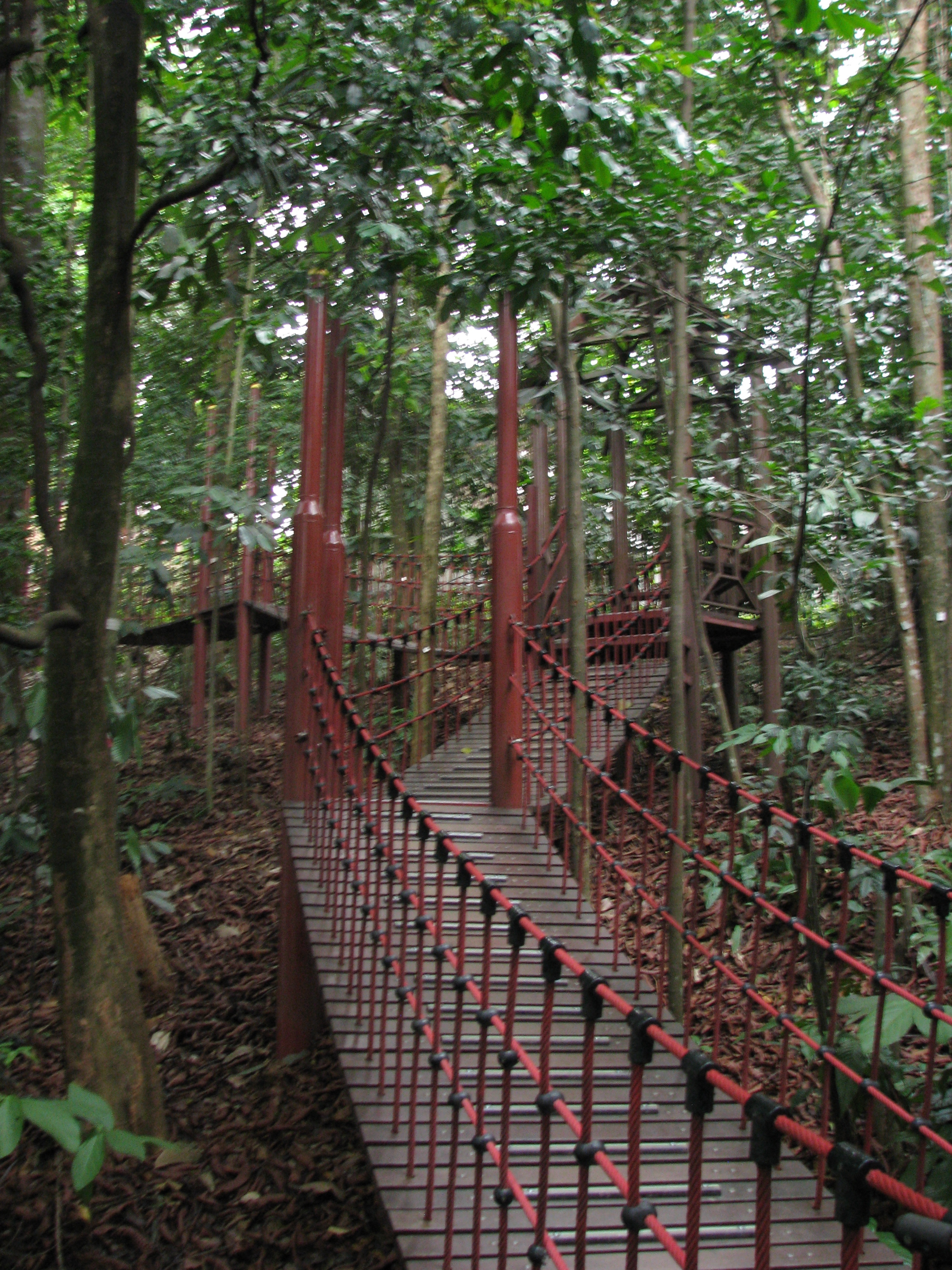
A trail in the KL Forest Eco Park

Bukit Nanas is known to be one of the earliest Malay settlements in Kuala Lumpur and the center of Malay power there. In around 1857, Raja Abdullah of Klang raised funds to open tin mines in the Ampang area, and in doing so, initiating the development of Kuala Lumpur as a major settlement on banks of the Klang River that would serve the mines further inland. To strengthen his authority in the area, Raja Abdullah then sent his Bugis lieutenant Syahbandar Yaseh with some armed men to serve as the garrison for Kuala Lumpur. Yaseh selected Bukit Nanas as the location to build a stockade in the 1860s. A map of Kuala Lumpur sketched by Sir Frank Swettenham in 1875 showed a place marked as "Malay Rajah's house on hill" which is likely to be the Bukit Nanas stockade. The place is said to be originally called Bukit Gombak, and only became known as Bukit Nanas later. According to one story, pineapples (nanas in Malay) were grown all around the stockade as a deterrence against attackers during the Klang War by Raja Asal, hence the place became known as Bukit Nanas or "Pineapple Hill".

The Klang War was sparked off in part due to Yaseh's mishandling of a dispute with the Sumatran Batu Bahara community in the area. A member of the Yaseh's garrison killed someone named Enche' Rasul from the Batu Bahara community. Raja Abdullah, however, refused to punish the Bugis man, and the aggrieved Sumatrans led by Mohamed Akib then suggested to Raja Mahdi, who at that time was involved in a dispute with Raja Abdullah, that they would support him should he wish to attack Raja Abdullah. Raja Mahdi happily accepted the offer and initiated the Klang War in 1867. Raja Asal and Sutan Puasa, leaders of Sumatran Mandailing settlers in Selangor, also switched side to Raja Mahdi. Raja Asal laid siege to Bukit Nanas, where Tengku Kudin's men and various mercenaries including Europeans were stationed. The siege forced Tengku Kudin's men to try to escape, but they were captured at Petaling and killed. Yap Ah Loy (a Hakka clan Leader), the Kapitan of Kuala Lumpur, however, managed to escape to Klang. Kuala Lumpur was then taken by Raja Mahdi's forces and destroyed. Yaseh himself was killed In 1872 in the war. Traces of a tunnel dating to the Klang War period have been found in Bukit Nanas.

In 1906, 17.5 hectare of land on Bukit Nanas was gazetted as a forest reserve. Large parts however have since been used for the development of the Kuala Lumpur Tower and other purposes, and now only 9.3 hectares of the forest reserve remains. It was initially known as Bucket Weld Forest Reserve, later renamed Bukit Nanas Forest Reserve, and now known as KL Forest Eco Park. The local Chinese communities living around Kuala Lumpur during that time named it 咖啡山 Kopi San or "Coffee Hill".

Two of Malaysia's many British colonial-era schools were built on this hill in the early twentieth century. They are the St John's Institution first established in 1904 and Convent Bukit Nanas. St. John's Institution has been gazetted as a National Heritage Site by the federal government. Another landmark on Bukit Nanas is the Roman Catholic St John's Cathedral.

A cable car service was built in Bukit Nanas in the 1970s but it has been discontinued since the 1980s. In August 2012 the forest was closed to the public whilst the cable car was rebuilt. The forest trail has since reopened, however, the cable car service has not yet been restored as of January 2017.

In 1996, the Kuala Lumpur Tower, which is the seventh tallest telecommunications tower in the world was built on the hill. It has an observation deck, a banquet floor and a revolving restaurant. The Bukit Nanas Monorail station opened in 2003.

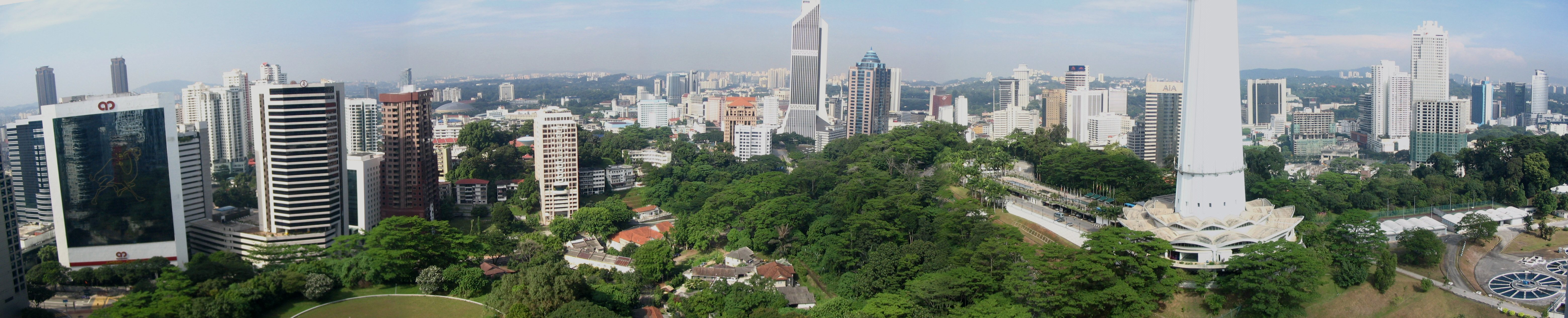
Panoramic view of Bukit Nanas

== Gallery ==
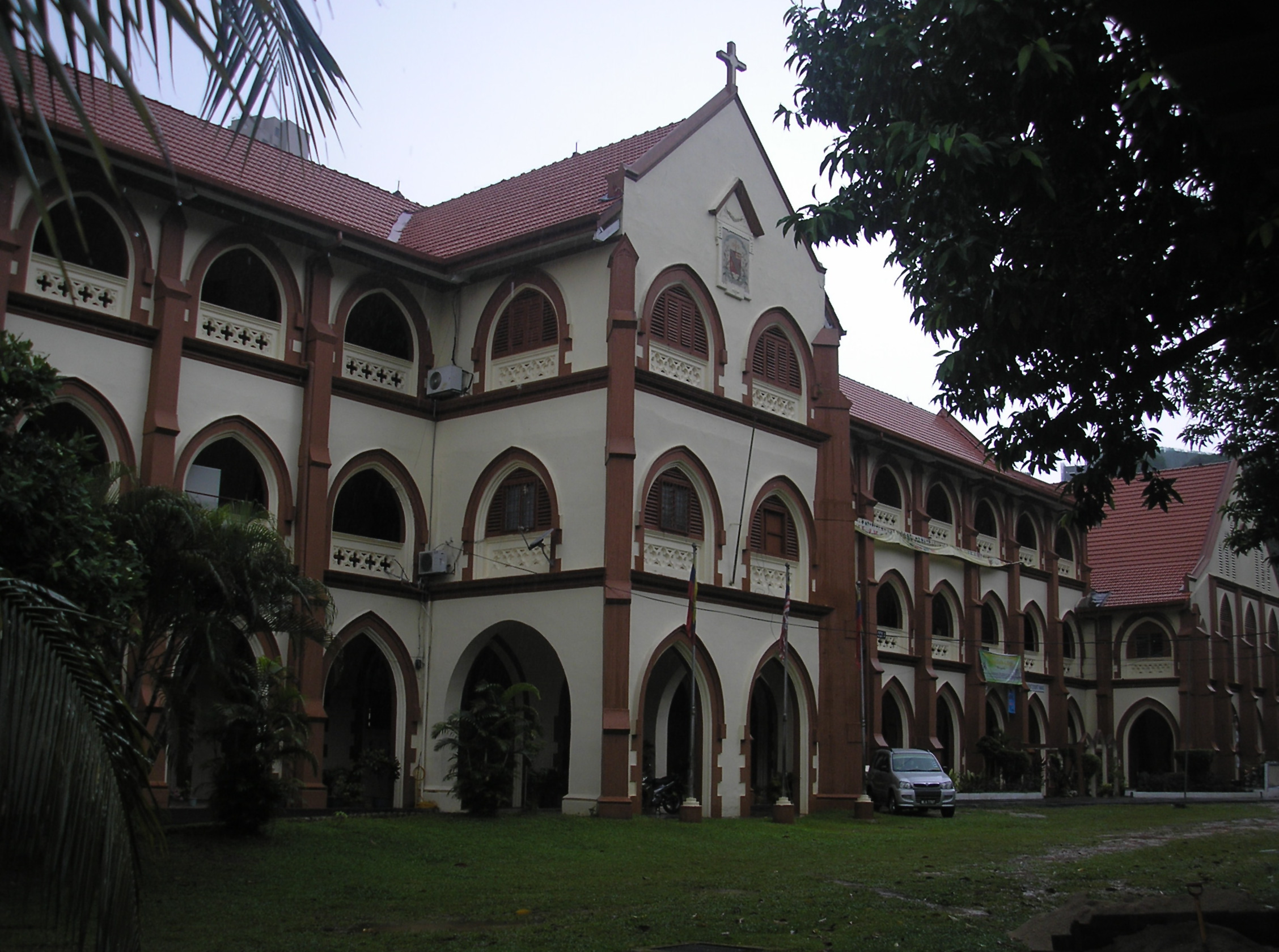
Bukit Nanas Convent

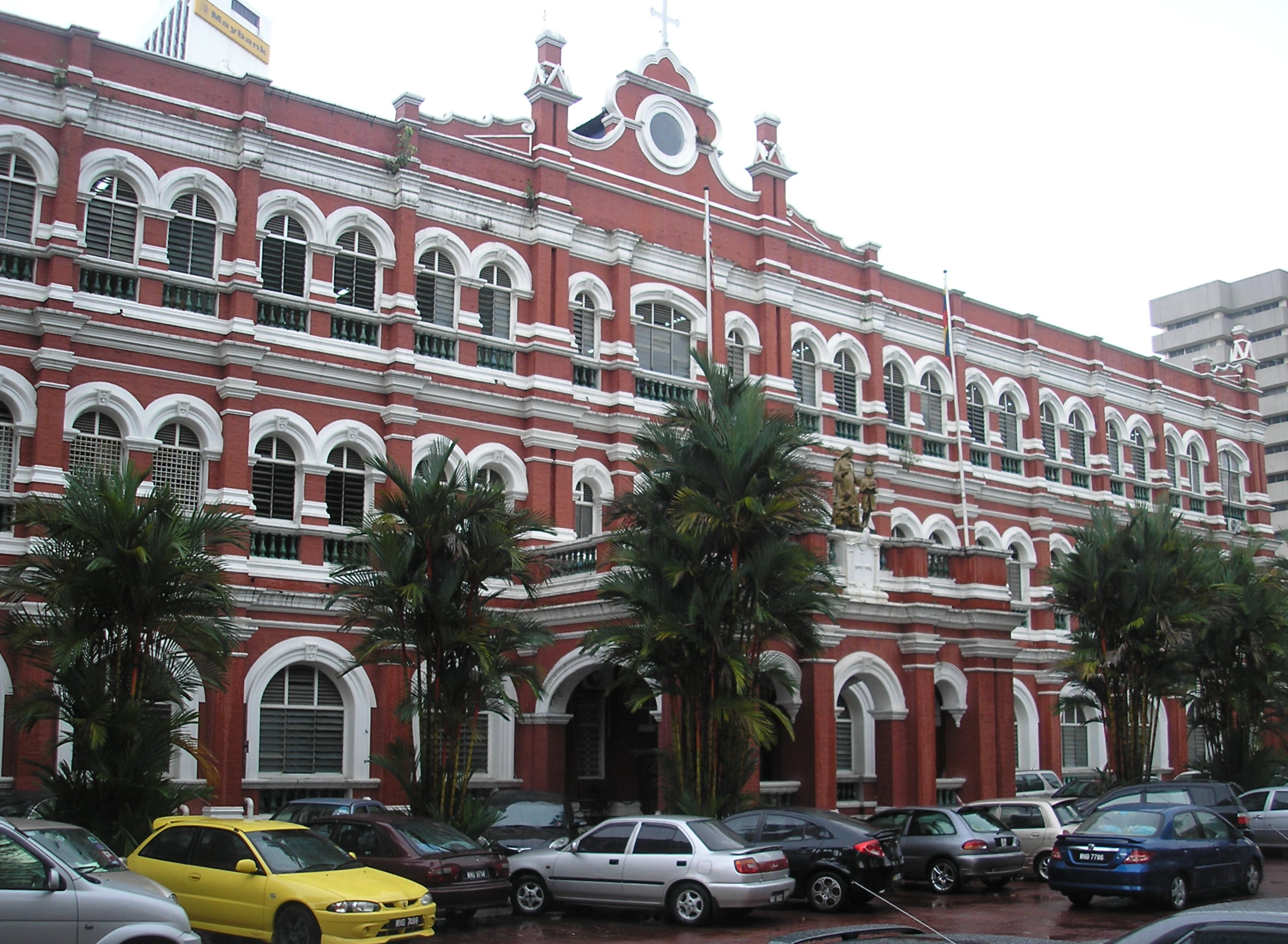
St. John's Institution

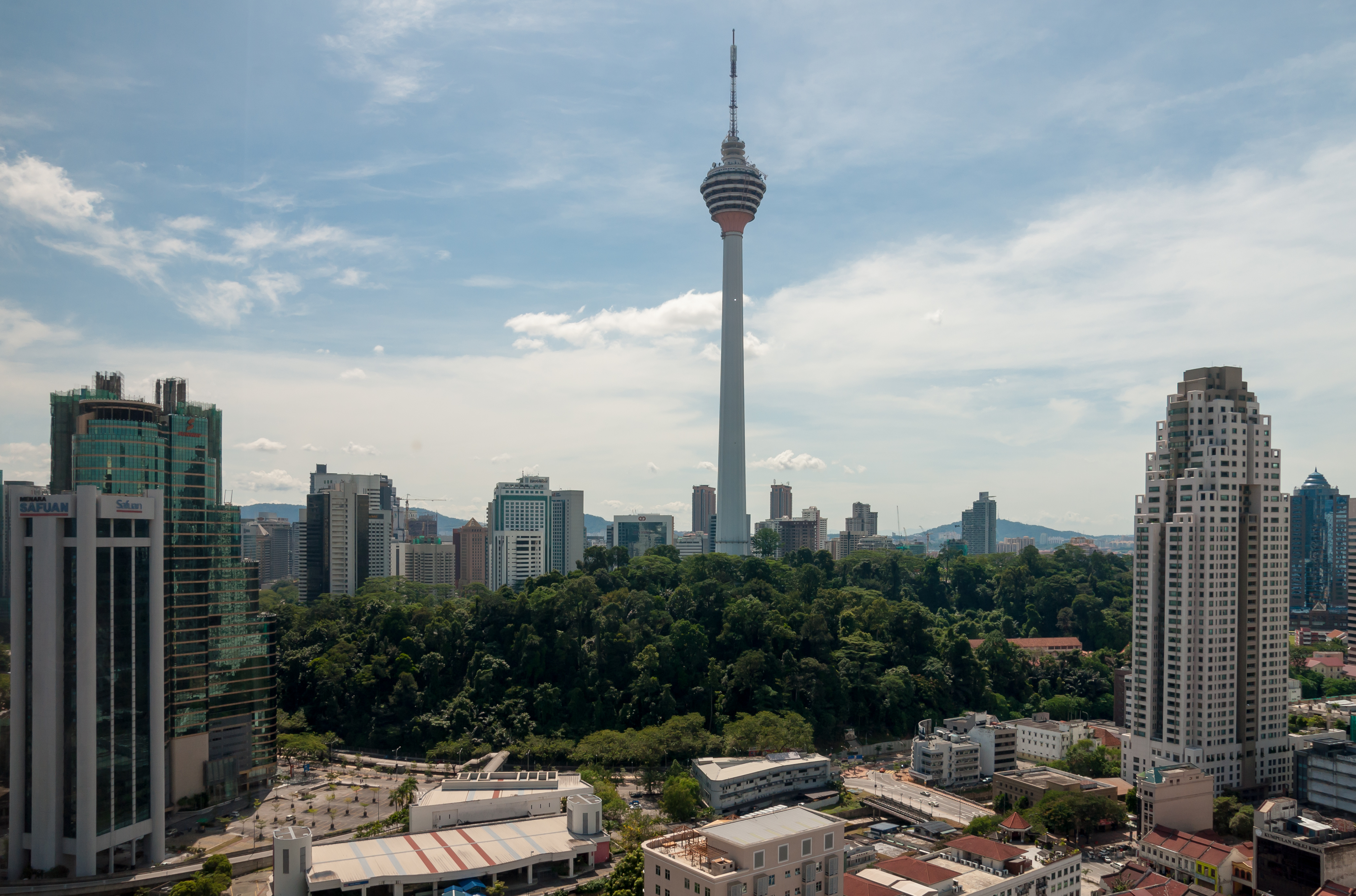
KL Tower on Bukit Nanas
