= Raja Abdullah bin Raja Jaafar =

Selangor nobleman (1825–1869)

Orang Besar Daerah Klang Raja Abdullah bin Raja Jaafar
- Born: Raja Abdullah; 1825
- Died: 1869 (age 44); While sailing at Selat Melaka
- Burial place: Ketapang, Melaka
- Occupation: Tin ore entrepreneur
- Spouses: Raja Khalijah binti Orang Besar Kelang Raja Haji ibni Yang di-Pertuan Selangor Sultan Ibrahim Shah; Che Anjung Riau
- Children: Raja Hassan bin Raja Abdullah; Raja Ismail bin Raja Abdullah; Raja Muhammad bin Raja Abdullah; Raja Impeh bin Raja Abdullah; Raja Abdul Rahman bin Raja Abdullah; Raja Lebar Anjang binti Raja Abdullah
- Parents: Raja Jaafar bin Yang di-Pertuan Muda Johor-Riau Raja Ali (father); *Biological mother: Commoner / Raja Jaafar concubine (unknown); Step mother: Raja Saudah binti Raja Jaafar bin Yang di-Pertuan Muda Johor-Riau Raja Haji (mother)
- Relatives: Raja Ismail bin Raja Jaafar; Raja Muhammad bin Raja Jaafar; Raja Hassan bin Raja Jaafar; Raja Jumaat bin Raja Jaafar; Raja Hussein bin Raja Jaafar
- Family: Upu Daeng brothers

Raja Abdullah bin Raja Jaafar (Jawi: راج عبدالله بن راج جعفر) was a Selangor Nobleman during the reign of Sultan Muhammad Shah and the first Tin ore Malay pioneer. He also then owner of the Klang River, founder and administrator of Kuala Lumpur.

== History ==
His full born name was Raja Abdullah bin Raja Jaafar bin Yang di-Pertuan Muda Johor-Riau 5 Raja Ali bin Yang di-Pertuan Muda Johor-Riau 3 Daeng Kemboja bin Daeng Parani bin Daeng Rilaga. He came from the Malay-Bugis royal family of the Johor-Riau Sultanate.

Between 1834 and 1836, a conflict between the Malays and the Chinese have just ended in Lukut. At that time, Raja Abdullah had followed his father Raja Jaafar and his brother Raja Jumaat to Lukut and develop tin mines in the area. It is estimated that he arrived in Lukut around 1835.

In 1836, Sultan Muhammad Shah went to Lukut and he established good relations with Raja Jaafar's family. He declared Lukut as part of the Selangor district and appointed Raja Jumaat, Raja Jaafar's son, as his representative in Lukut. In 1839, Sultan Muhammad married his daughter, Tengku Senai, to Raja Jumaat, while Raja Abdullah was married to his niece, Raja Khalijah binti Raja Haji ibni al-Marhum Sultan Ibrahim Shah.

=== As Owner of Klang River ===
In 1839, Sultan Muhammad Shah gave the Klang River valley to his eldest son, Raja Sulaiman, but it was found that Raja Sulaiman did not really try to get much revenue from the Klang district. After Raja Sulaiman died, Sultan Muhammad gave the Klang River valley district to his brother-in-law, Raja Abdullah, instead of giving it to Raja Mahadi, the son of the late Raja Sulaiman.Raja Abdullah and his brother Raja Juma'at had previously helped Raja Sulaiman settle a debt incurred during a failed mining venture. Raja Mahadi was not satisfied and thought that he should have inherited the Klang district but his rights were simply set aside.

Raja Abdullah had lived with his father at Lukut in a very large house which stood on a hill, inside a fort at the mouth of the Lukut river. When he moved to Klang and had opened several tin mines up river, he decided to build a house and a store for himself. He brought builders and carpenters from Lukut and they started work in 1856. A year later they had completed a large two-storied house close to the Klang river, very similar to that of his father. It was called Gedung Raja Abdullah. He and his family lived upstairs. Downstairs there were several smaller rooms which were used for storing tin, and for mining equipment and for rice, oil, opium and other supplies for the miners, who were Chinese from Lukut and Malacca.

Then, after Sultan Muhammad Shah died in 1857 and was replaced by Sultan Abdul Samad, his Majesty further strengthened the ownership rights of the Klang River valley to Raja Abdullah by granting him a letter of authority on 18 September 1864.

=== As Kuala Lumpur founder ===
In 1857, after Raja Abdullah was appointed by Sultan Muhammad Shah as the Orang Besar of the Klang District, Raja Abdullah met with his brother Raja Jumaat, and they agreed to run a tin mine opening company. Raja Abdullah, bringing 87 Chinese laborers from Lukut, went up the Klang River to look for a good place to open a mine. Raja Abdullah and the Chinese laborers he brought reached the upper reaches of the Klang River and landed at a place chosen by Raja Abdullah, namely on the banks of the junction of the Klang River and the Gombak River, and the place was called Lumpur. From there, Raja Abdullah and his men walked directly inland and reached a place that was later called Ampang and that was the place chosen by Raja Abdullah and he had his men cut down the forest there to open a tin mine. At this moment, it were noted that Raja Abdullah was the individual responsible for choosing a place on the banks of the junction of the Klang River and the Gombak River to land and open a tin mine in Ampang; When the mines in Ampang were opened in the chosen area, Raja Abdullah set up roof shops where he sold necessities for the mine workers in Ampang, and the place was also used as a base for commuting to Klang via the Klang River, so that the area had a large population and was later known as Kuala Lumpur.This further reaffirmed by Dato' Amar Diraja Penghulu Istiadat Selangor, Wan Muhammad Amin bin Wan Muhammad Sa'id.

After the mines were opened, Raja Abdullah then sent a garrison under the command of a Bugis lieutenant to man a stockade built at Bukit Nanas.

== Klang War ==
In 1866, Raja Abdullah appointed two Singaporean merchants named W.H. Reed and Baba Tan Kim Cheng as official tax collectors in the Klang district, and in all the areas under King Abdullah's rule, namely Kuala Lumpur, Petaling, Kanching and Ampang. According to custom, the children of the king were exempted from paying taxes. The custom was abolished due to the greed of the two tax collectors.

At the time of the new tax regulations, Raja Mahadi was in Malacca on business; although Raja Mahadi was offended at not being appointed as the Orang Besar of the Klang district, he complied with the Sultan's decision. Instead of a royal family living a luxurious life, he had to earn a living by trading goods from the Straits Settlements to be sold in Klang and around the Kuala Lumpur mining area.

When Raja Mahadi returned to Selangor about a month after the regulations came into effect, Raja Mahadi brought two chests of opium to be sold to Chinese miners in Kuala Lumpur. He was asked to pay a tax of $100. He refused to pay the tax, which led to his trade being confiscated. Raja Mahadi felt that the person who had occupied his position illegally according to custom had acted beyond the bounds.

In 1866, there was a fight between the Sumatrans, especially the Batu Bara people, and the Bugis in the Dato' Bandar Yasih fortress in Kuala Lumpur. Dato' Bandar Yasih was a follower of Raja Abdullah whom he brought from Riau. The leader of the Bugis in this fight was known as Suliwatang and the other was Wak Si Galah. The leader of the Batu Bara people was named Muhammad Akib, assisted by his brother named Nonggok (he was later made Dato' Dagang, and after performing the hajj took the name Haji Muhammad Tahir). In the fight, the Batu Bara people and the Bugis people killed each other. The Bugis were more numerous than the Batu Bara people. A Batu Bara person named Panchik Rasul was killed by the Bugis. Many Bugis were also seriously injured by Nonggok.

Muhammad Akib and his brother Nonggok complained to Raja Abdullah and demanded that the Bugis be punished for committing the murders, but the demand was ignored by Raja Abdullah. Then Muhammad Akib went to see Raja Mahadi to complain about the incident that had occurred, they expressed their willingness to Raja Mahadi to help fight against Raja Abdullah. So Raja Mahadi's heart was open to accept the call for war.

Raja Mahadi easily received support from the king's sons who had not been happy with the tax collection imposed on them. Not long after, with the support of the Sumatrans in the hinterland of the Klang River who had taken up arms, Raja Mahadi besieged the Orang Besar Klang fortress (Gedung Raja Abdullah) and expelled Raja Abdullah. Raja Abdullah and his followers were very hated by the people at that time, and Raja Mahadi's rebellion was a popular rebellion that in a short time Raja Abdullah was defeated. Raja Mahadi automatically became Orang Besar Klang and controlled the entire area under Raja Abdullah's control.

In 1867, Sultan Abdul Samad was forced to acknowledge Raja Mahadi as the Orang Besar of Klang on the condition that Raja Mahadi should pay $500 from the tax collected from his district to his Majesty every month. But Raja Mahadi, because he was too drunk with his victory, and in a short time became the most influential person in Selangor, ignored his Majesty's conditions. Raja Abdullah's sons also did not stop urging him to remove Raja Mahadi. Because his position was too weak because he had no soldiers and was only ruled according to custom while the power of government was in the hands of the nobles, he was powerless to force Raja Mahadi to pay the tax that had been set, and could not do anything with the insistence of Raja Abdullah's sons.

== Deceased ==
In early 1869, Raja Abdullah, who had been expelled from Klang, had been living in Malacca for two years. While on a voyage to Singapore, he fell ill and was taken back to Malacca and eventually died in Ketapang, Malacca.

== Legacy ==
His warehouse is still preserved in Klang, Selangor. A stree and school were named after him in Kuala Lumpur.

1. Gedung Raja Abdullah
2. Jalan Raja Abdullah, Kuala Lumpur
3. Sekolah Menengah Kebangsaan Raja Abdullah
