= Mandailing people =

Ethnic group in Sumatra, Indonesia

Mandailing people Alak Mandailing
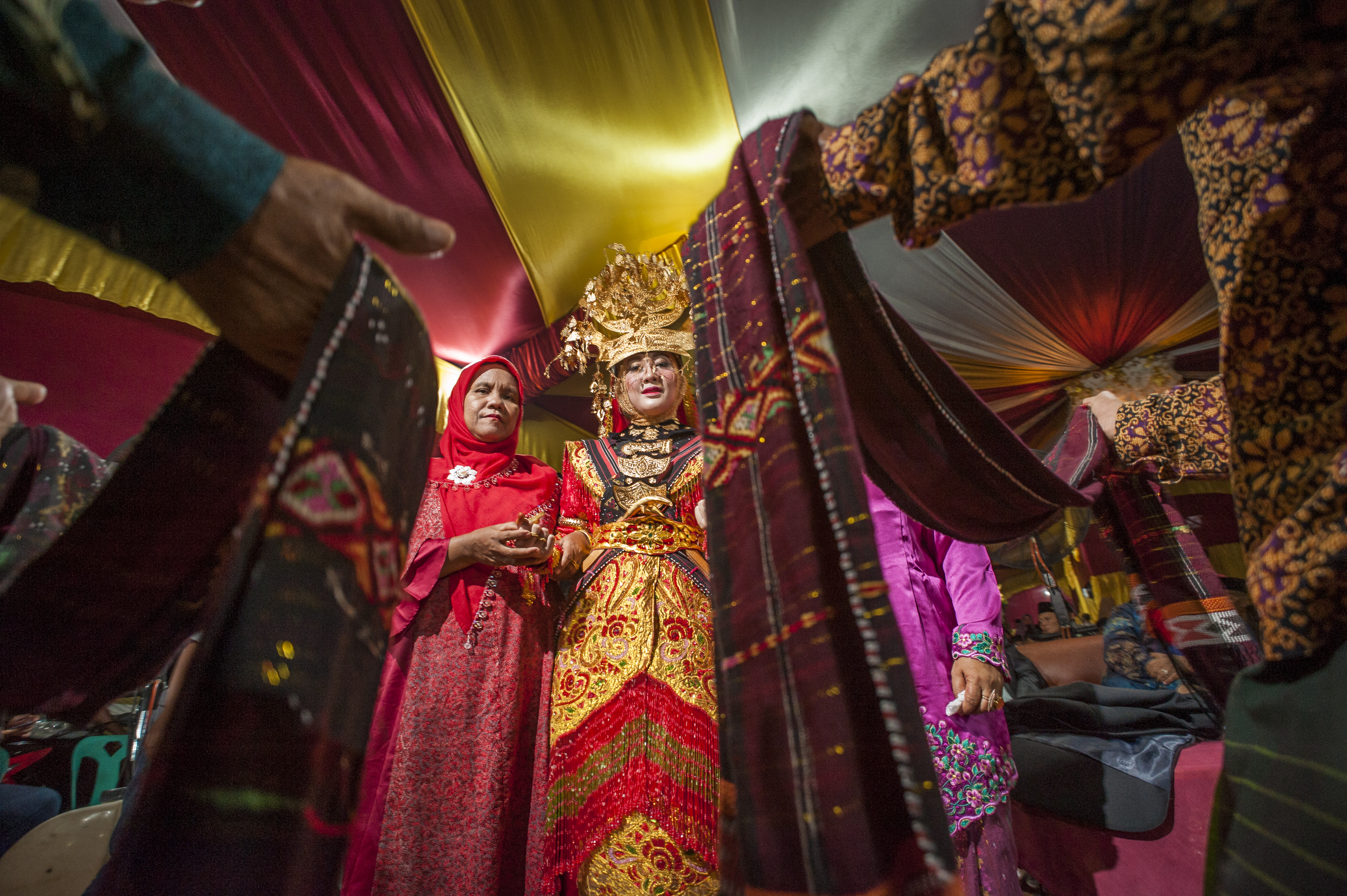
- A photograph of a girl dressed in a Mandailing traditional dress during the Mangulosi ceremony on her wedding day, known as Horja Godang, pic taken: 2020

Total population
- 1,034,690 (2000)

Regions with significant populations
- Indonesia: North Sumatra 906,939 (2000); West Sumatra 127,751 (2000); Riau 77,611 (2000) (Note: Based on the estimated 7.5% of the Bataks total population in Riau in Figure 2.5.2.); Jakarta 41,393 (2000) (Note: Based on the estimated 4% of the Bataks total population in Jakarta in Figure 2.5.2.); Malaysia: 30,000 (2001)

Languages
- Mandailing, Indonesian, Minang, English

Religion
- Predominantly Sunni Islam (99%); Minority Christianity (1%)

Related ethnic groups
- Minangkabau people, Angkola people, Toba people

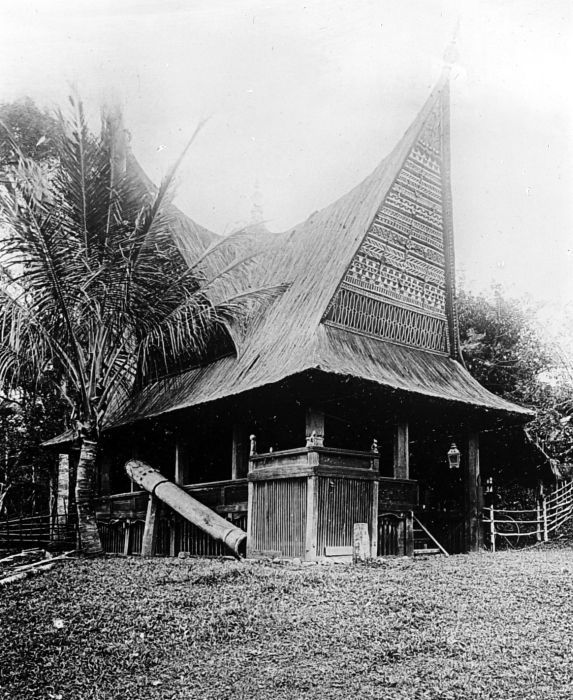
A traditional house in Mandailing Natal Regency.

The Mandailing (also known as Mandailing Batak) people are one of the sub-ethnic groups of the Batak people, found mainly in North Sumatra and West Sumatra, Indonesia. They are found mainly in the northern section of the island of Sumatra in Indonesia. They came under the influence of the Kaum Padri who ruled the Minangkabau people. As a result, the Mandailing people were influenced by Muslim culture and converted to Islam. There is also a group of Mandailing in Malaysia, especially in the states of Selangor and Perak. They are closely related to the Angkola and Toba.

== Etymology ==
The etymology of 'Mandailing' is said to be a compounding of the words mande, meaning 'mother', and hilang, meaning 'lost'. Thus, the name is said to mean "lost mother". Mandailing society is patriarchal, employing family names, or marga. Well-known Mandailing margas include: Lubis, Nasution, Siregar, Ritonga, Hasibuan, Harahap, Dalimunthe (originally from Munthe), Matondang, Rangkuti, Parinduri, Puasa, Pulungan, Rambe, Daulae(y), Pohan, Batubara (not to be confused with the Batu Bara people from the east coast of Sumatra), Barus and Hutajulu.

== History ==
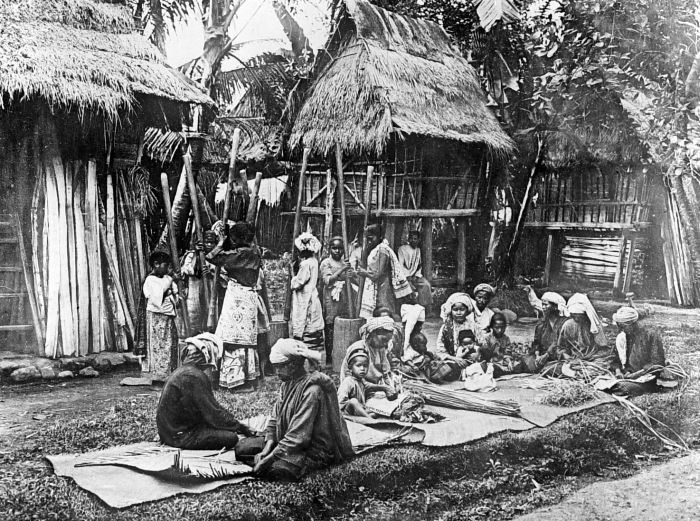
Plating mats and pounding rice in Pakantan.

According to Tamboen's account (1952) the Mandailing, along with other sub-ethnic Batak groups are the descendants of one man by the name of Batak; who migrated to the south before the coming of the Portuguese and Dutch colonisation of Sumatra. Moreover, many Mandailing people are of Minangkabau descent from Pagaruyung in the Minangkabau highlands, such as the Nasution clan. Dutch colonization in Sumatra caused the Mandailing to be included as a sub-category of the Batak, as part of a 'wedge policy' to create a non-Muslim buffer state called Batakland between the powerful Muslim Achehnese and Minangkabau nations. The Mandailing was associated with the Toba Batak people instead of being recognized as a distinct ethnic minority. Consequently, the Mandailing people have been torn between two cultural and ethnic identities, namely Batak-Mandailing in Indonesia and Malay-Mandailing in Malaysia.

=== The Padri War ===
The Padri War, which took place in West Sumatra and spread to the inland parts of East Sumatra between 1803 and 1845, caused an exodus of large groups of Mandailing from their homeland to peninsular Malaya. Among them were groups led by Raja Asal, the overlord of the Mandailings, and his nephew Raja Bilah. Together with Sutan Puasa, they were embroiled in the Klang War from 1866 to 1873, also known as the Selangor War.Sutan Puasa later known as one of the founders of Kuala Lumpur.

Raja Asal and Raja Bilah fled to Perak, where their followers settled in Lower Perk and the Kinta Valley. The British appointed Raja Bilah Penghulu of Blanja while his son Raja Yacob became Penghulu of Tronoh, which generated large revenues after the opening of the Tronoh Mines, the largest tin producer in the world in the 1920s.

== Region ==
Mandailing is the name of the region Luat Mandailing, which is now almost in Mandailing Natal Regency in North Sumatra. The first groups who came to this region were the Lubis and Nasution, later followed by the Siregar, Harahap, and so forth. Nasution and Lubis are the biggest groups in the Mandailing clan. Other groups, such as Pulungan, Harahap, Matondang, Rangkuti, and others are the smaller groups of Luat Mandailing. Harahap and Siregar dwell almost in Luat Angkola, which now belongs to South Tapanuli Regency, situated between Regency and North Tapanuli Regency.

== Religion ==
The Mandailing people are almost entirely Muslims. Opinion varies on when Islam first arrived in the region, where the 19th century, 18th century, or even earlier have been suggested. In the 19th century, a portion of the Mandailing were converted to Islam during the Padri War when Muslim clerics from west Sumatra pressured them to adopt the religion. After conversion, Islam took firm roots in the Mandailing people through integration with the larger Muslim Malay world. The Mandailing people were able to retain many of their native religious practices and adopted an indigenized form of Islam until the modern era, especially in Malaysia where they were forced to conform to state-sponsored Islam. A small portion of the Mandailing community also embraces Christianity. The first Christian teachings in the Mandailing region were in the Pakantan area brought by evangelists from Switzerland and Russia in 1821. Therefore, the oldest church in Tapanuli is located in Huta Bargot. The Mandailing Christian community is currently only around ± 1%, and almost all Mandailing Christians synod at the Angkola Protestant Christian Church, which is the same as the Batak Angkola community who are Christian. This is because there are several cultural similarities between Angkola and Mandailing that allow Angkola and Mandailing Christians to be under the same Church synod.

== Migrations ==
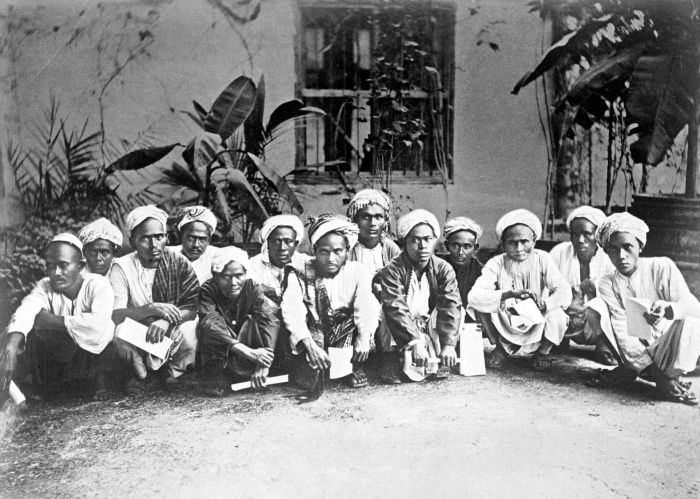
Pilgrims of Mandailing people in Mecca, 1880.

The Mandailing people are also known as the great travellers as more and more of the Mandailings are migrating to the various regions in the country as well as around the world. Many of the Mandailings are playing the important roles of the nation. The Indonesian government considered the Mandailings as one of the main tribes in the country. Many Mandailings keep detailed family tree records as it has become the family tradition. It is reported that 98% of the Mandailing ethnic group are Muslim. There are approximately more than one hundred thousand Mandailings In Malaysia nowadays. Many of the Mandailings in Malaysia are visiting their ancestors in Mandailing Regency in Indonesia as it has been a tradition to keep the brotherhood and strong bond of unity among the Mandailings.

The Mandailing language is still used by the descendants of Mandailing immigrants in Malaysia, although language shift to Malay is observed among the younger generation.

== Culture ==
The Mandailing classic of daun ubi tumbuk or mashed tapioca leaves, lush with bunga kantan, lemongrass and coconut milk flavor is a famous food among the Mandailing people.

They have a traditional ensemble of drums called Gordang Sambilan.

== Controversy ==
The majority of the population considers themselves not part of Batak as Ethnolinguistic group The Mandailing people has blood ties, kinship, language, writing script, social systems, arts, customs and norms that are similar to the Toba Batak and Angkola Batak.

== Notable people ==
- Abdul Haris Nasution, National Hero of Indonesia
- Adam Malik, 3rd Vice President of Indonesia

== See also ==
- Lumbandolok
