= Yap Ah Loy =

Former Kapitan China of Kuala Lumpur

Kapitan China Yap Ah Loy
- 葉亞來
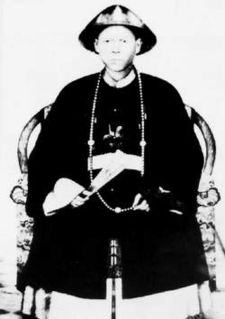
- Yap Ah Loy

Kapitan China of Kuala Lumpur
- In office 1868–1885
- Preceded by: Liu Ngim Kong
- Succeeded by: Yap Ah Shak

Personal details
- Born: 14 March 1837 Huiyang District, Guangdong, Qing China
- Died: 15 April 1885 (aged 48) Kuala Lumpur, Selangor, Federated Malay States
- Resting place: Kwong Tong Cemetery
- Spouse: Kok Kang Kweon (郭庚嬌)
- Children: Yap Hon Chin Yap Loong Shin; Yap Loong Fong; Yap Kim Neo Yap Ngit Thian

Kapitan China Yap Ah Loy (Chinese: 葉亞來; pinyin: Yè Yǎlái; Cantonese Yale: Yihp A-lòih; Pha̍k-fa-sṳ: Ya̍p Â-lòi, Jawi: يڤ اه لوي; 14 March 1837 – 15 April 1885), also known as Yap Tet Loy and Yap Mao Lan, was the father of Kuala Lumpur. He served as the third Kapitan China of Kuala Lumpur, and in this administrative capacity, played an important role in developing the city as a commercial and mining centre during the 19th century.

After the independence of the Federation of Malaya from the British Empire on 31 August 1957 and later the Formation of Malaysia in 1963, Kuala Lumpur became the capital of Malaysia. Today, there is a street named after him in the heart of Chinatown in Kuala Lumpur, known as "Jalan Yap Ah Loy" or "Yap Ah Loy Road".

== Background ==
Yap Ah Loy was born in a poor village at what was formerly known as Canton province, southern China, on 14 March 1837. His parents lived in the town of Danshui/Tamsui (Chinese: 淡水; pinyin: Dànshuǐ) in Kwai Yap district, Huizhou prefecture. He was a Hakka of the Fui Chiu (Chinese: 惠州) clan. Yap Ah Loy left China via Macau for British Malaya in 1854. On his arrival in Malaya, he found the place very different from China.

On his arrival at Malacca, Yap Ah Loy was given shelter by one of his clansman called Yap Ket Si. He was then taken to a tin mine in Durian Tunggal, where he stayed for 4 months. He soon left for Kesang in northwestern Johore, where he found work in the shop of a relative named Yap Ng. He remained there for a year before arrangements were made to send him back to China via Singapore. Misfortune befell him when he lost all his money while waiting for the junk to set sail in Singapore for China. Instead of going back to Malacca, he and another of his relatives named Yap Fook travelled on foot to Lukut, then still part of Selangor (now Port Dickson, Negeri Sembilan).

== As Kapitan of Kuala Lumpur ==
Yap Ah Loy arrived in Lukut in 1856 at the age of 19. He spent his early years in the peninsula as a miner and petty trader, but in 1862 his fortunes improved when his friend Liu Ngim Kong (Chinese: 劉壬光; pinyin: Liú Rènguāng) succeeded Hiew Siew (Chinese: 丘秀) to become the second Kapitan Cina of Kuala Lumpur, a position not only of leadership within the Chinese community, but also of liaison with the Malay political system and, after British intervention in 1874, with British officials as well. He became Liu's trusted lieutenant and succeeded him as the third Kapitan Cina of Kuala Lumpur after Liu's death in 1869, after which he began to put together a sound administration and a strong fighting force.

Yap's appointment however was challenged by the "relatives" of Liu, and a group opposed to Yap emerged under the leadership of Chong Chong. There were also constant warfare between two Chinese gangs, the Hakka-dominated Hai San (dominant in Kuala Lumpur) and the Cantonese-dominated Ghee Hin (based mainly in the Kanching and Rawang area), who fought to gain control of tin production in the town. He received support from Sutan Puasa, an influential Sumatran traders among the Malays. At Kanching, an ally of Yap Ah Loy, Yap Ah Sze, was ambushed and murdered, probably at the instigation of Chong Chong, another Hakka headman. Yap Ah Loy then took his men to Kanching to drive out Chong Chong in 1870, and 12 Chinese and 8 Malays were killed in what would become known as 'the Kanching Massacre'. Chong Chong then fled to Rawang and joined Raja Mahdi's faction in the Selangor Civil War that broke out earlier in 1867. Yap Ah Loy sided with Tunku Kudin in the civil war, and Kuala Lumpur was attacked in 1870 by Yap's enemies who sided with Raja Mahadi. A further attack was attempted, and in 1872, Raja Mahdi's forces led by Syed Mashhor captured Kuala Lumpur, forcing Yap Ah Loy to flee to Klang. Yap attempted to retake Kuala Lumpur, and in March 1873, Tengku Kudin's faction, with support from Pahang fighters, defeated Mashhor and recaptured Kuala Lumpur.

Yap's victory at Kuala Lumpur in 1873 placed him in a strong political position, and he was almost supreme in the interior of the state. However, Kuala Lumpur was gutted during the war and the mines flooded. Yap then set about rebuilding the town and rejuvenating the mining industry. He also improved the roads linking Kuala Lumpur with adjacent mining areas and other settlements. A slump in tin price mid 1870s however caused severe financial difficulties. He started a brick-making venture at Brickfields, as well as a tapioca plantation although that proved a costly failure. By the late 1870s he was in considerable debt and said to be almost bankrupt. However, a rise in the price of tin in 1879 improved his financial position as well as securing the future of Kuala Lumpur.

Yap's achievement in the postwar recovery of the mining industry established Kuala Lumpur as the economic centre of the peninsula. As the acknowledged leader of the Chinese community, he was given the powers similar to a Malay ruling chief by the British, except for the right to tax, a restriction he easily evaded. Through his control of the tin market and his diverse business interests, he amassed a considerable personal fortune.

In 1879, the first British resident (government advisor) was assigned to Kuala Lumpur, and from that time the power of the Kapitan began to be undermined. None of Yap Ah Loy's successors approached his power and independence of action.

In 1884, Yap Ah Loy planned a visit to China, intending to appoint Yap Ah Shak and Chow Yuk to manage his property in his absence. For some reason the plan was never carried out. On 1 September that year, a violent storm struck the Klang Valley, causing widespread damage to property in Kuala Lumpur. The storm blew down 14 houses and a wing of the newly built Police barracks, as well as the barrack's residential area and the flagstaff.

== Developer of Kuala Lumpur ==
In 1868, as the third Chinese Kapitan of Kuala Lumpur, Yap Ah Loy, emerged as leader. He became responsible for the survival and growth of this town. During the early times, Kuala Lumpur was beset with many problems, including the Selangor Civil War which devastated the town. It was also plagued by diseases and constant fires and floods. Kuala Lumpur was destroyed several times, but each time Yap rebuilt the town. He strove to develop Kuala Lumpur from a small, obscure settlement into a booming mining town. In 1880, the state capital of Selangor was moved from Klang to the more strategically advantageous Kuala Lumpur.

In 1881, a flood swept through the town following a fire which engulfed it earlier. These successive problems destroyed the town's structures made of wood and atap (thatching). As a response, Frank Swettenham, the British Resident of Selangor, required that buildings be constructed of brick and tile. Hence, Kapitan Yap Ah Loy bought a sprawling piece of real estate for the setting up of a brick industry which would spur the rebuilding of Kuala Lumpur. This place is the eponymous Brickfields. Destroyed atap buildings were replaced with brick and tiled ones. Yap also restructured the building layout of the town. Many of the new brick buildings mirrored those of shop houses in southern China, characterized by "five foot ways" as well as skilled Chinese carpentry work. This resulted in a distinct eclectic shop house architecture typical of this region. In this developing town, Yap owned a third of all the buildings in Kuala Lumpur, and two thirds of the urban land east of the Klang River, in addition to his control of the tin mines. Yap Ah Loy also spent $20,000 to expand road access in the city significantly, linking up tin mines with the city; these roads include the main arterial roads of Ampang Road, Pudu Road and Petaling Street.

As Chinese Kapitan, he was vested with wide powers on par with Malay community leaders. He implemented law reforms and introduced new legal measures. He would also preside over a small claims court. With a police force consisting of only six officers, he was able to uphold the rule of law. He built a prison which could accommodate 60 prisoners. Kapitan Yap Ah Loy also built Kuala Lumpur's first school and a major tapioca mill in Petaling Street in which the Selangor's Sultan Abdul Samad had an interest.

After Yap's death in 1885, the population of Kuala Lumpur increased greatly due to the construction of a Port Klang Line railway line, initiated by Swettenham and completed in 1886, which increased accessibility into the growing town. In 1896, Kuala Lumpur was chosen as the capital of the newly formed Federated Malay States due to its central position. It was however Yap who was responsible for keeping Kuala Lumpur viable as a town during its many setbacks in its early years. Although there are no public monuments commemorating Yap, according to the scholar on Malaysian history J.M. Gullick, "if you seek his memorial remember that you are in Kuala Lumpur."

== Death ==
At the end of 1884, Yap Ah Loy fell ill with bronchitis and an abscess of the left lung. In March 1885, he made little recovery before he died on 15 April 1885 at the age of 48. The doctor examined Yap's body and later confirmed that his death was either due to heart failure or poisoning by the fumes of the charcoal brazier. The doctor also noticed the exceptional brightness of his eyes. He is buried in the large Kwong Tong Cemetery in Kuala Lumpur.

== See also ==
- Sin Sze Si Ya Temple

Government offices
Preceded by Kapitan Liu Ngim Kong	Kapitan China of Kuala Lumpur; 1868–1885	Succeeded by Kapitan Yap Ah Shak
