= 1945 =

1945 in various calendars
- Gregorian calendar: 1945; MCMXLV
- Ab urbe condita: 2698
- Armenian calendar: 1394; ԹՎ ՌՅՂԴ
- Assyrian calendar: 6695
- Baháʼí calendar: 101–102
- Balinese saka calendar: 1866–1867
- Bengali calendar: 1351–1352
- Berber calendar: 2895
- British Regnal year: 9 Geo. 6 – 10 Geo. 6
- Buddhist calendar: 2489
- Burmese calendar: 1307
- Byzantine calendar: 7453–7454
- Chinese calendar: 甲申年 (Wood Monkey); 4642 or 4435 — to — 乙酉年 (Wood Rooster); 4643 or 4436
- Coptic calendar: 1661–1662
- Discordian calendar: 3111
- Ethiopian calendar: 1937–1938
- Hebrew calendar: 5705–5706
- Hindu calendars
- Vikram Samvat: 2001–2002
- Shaka Samvat: 1866–1867
- Kali Yuga: 5045–5046
- Holocene calendar: 11945
- Igbo calendar: 945–946
- Iranian calendar: 1323–1324
- Islamic calendar: 1364–1365
- Japanese calendar: Shōwa 20 (昭和２０年)
- Javanese calendar: 1875–1876
- Juche calendar: 34
- Julian calendar: Gregorian minus 13 days
- Korean calendar: 4278
- Minguo calendar: ROC 34 民國34年
- Nanakshahi calendar: 477
- Thai solar calendar: 2488
- Tibetan calendar: ཤིང་ཕོ་སྤྲེ་ལོ་ (male Wood-Monkey); 2071 or 1690 or 918 — to — ཤིང་མོ་བྱ་ལོ་ (female Wood-Bird); 2072 or 1691 or 919

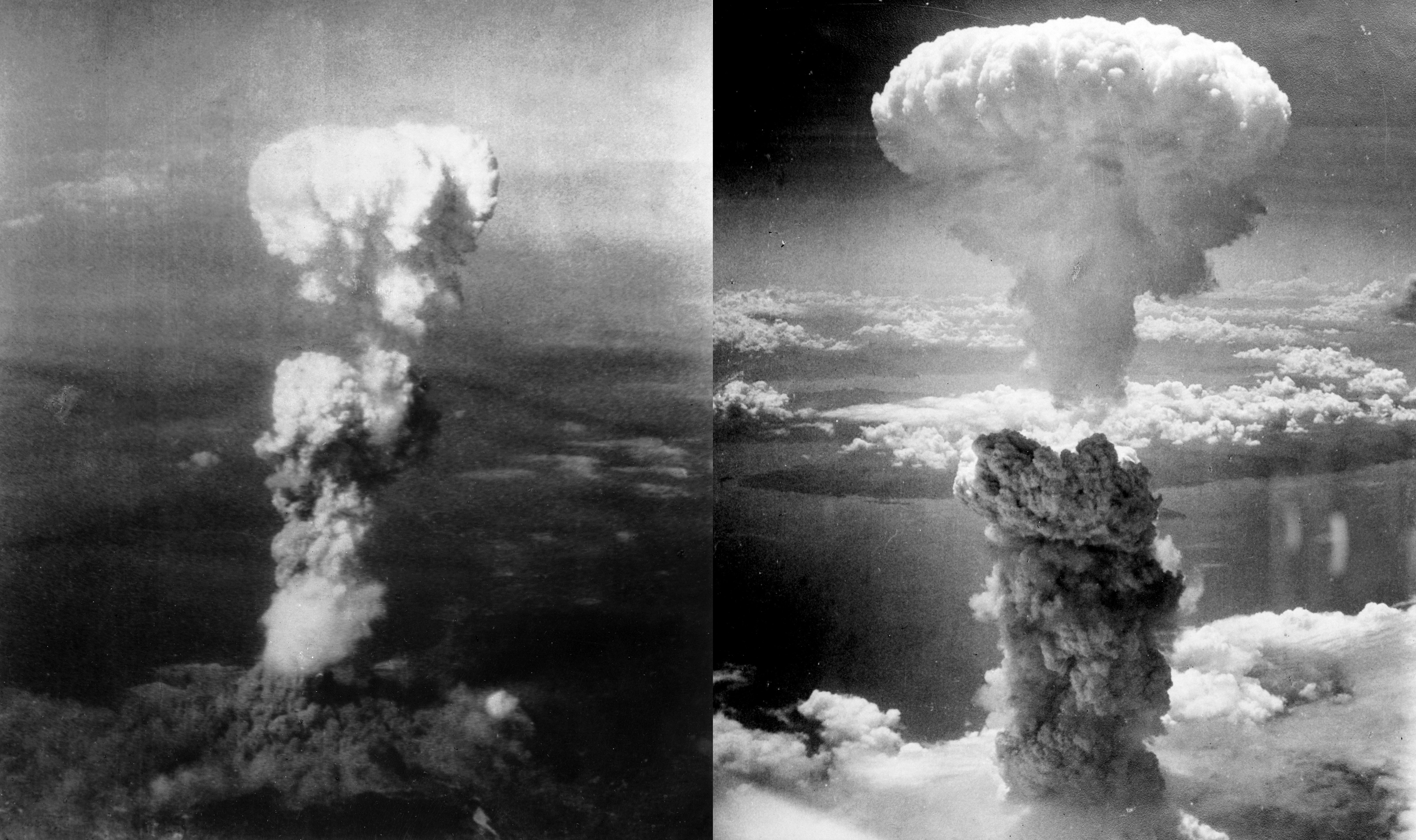
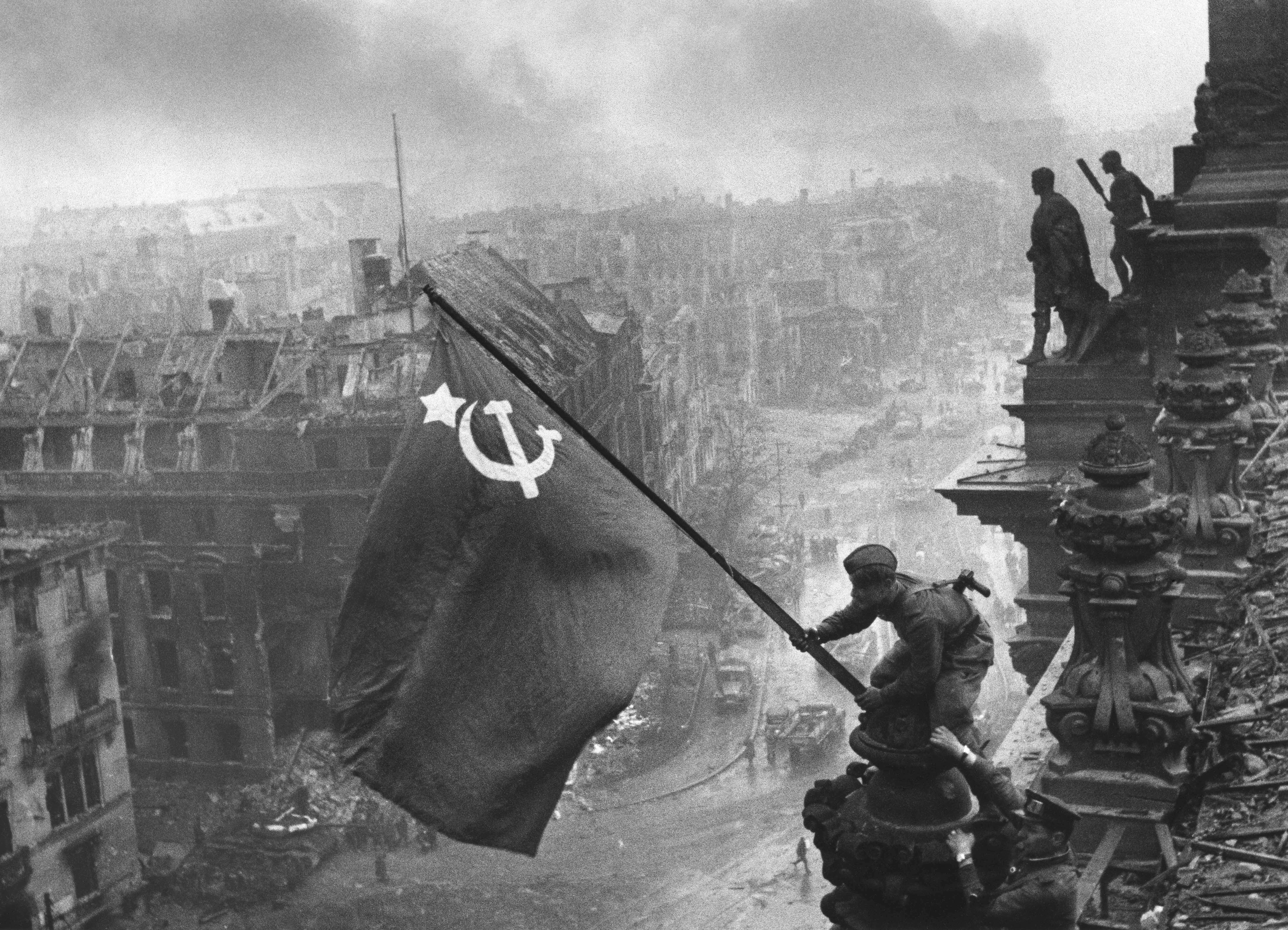
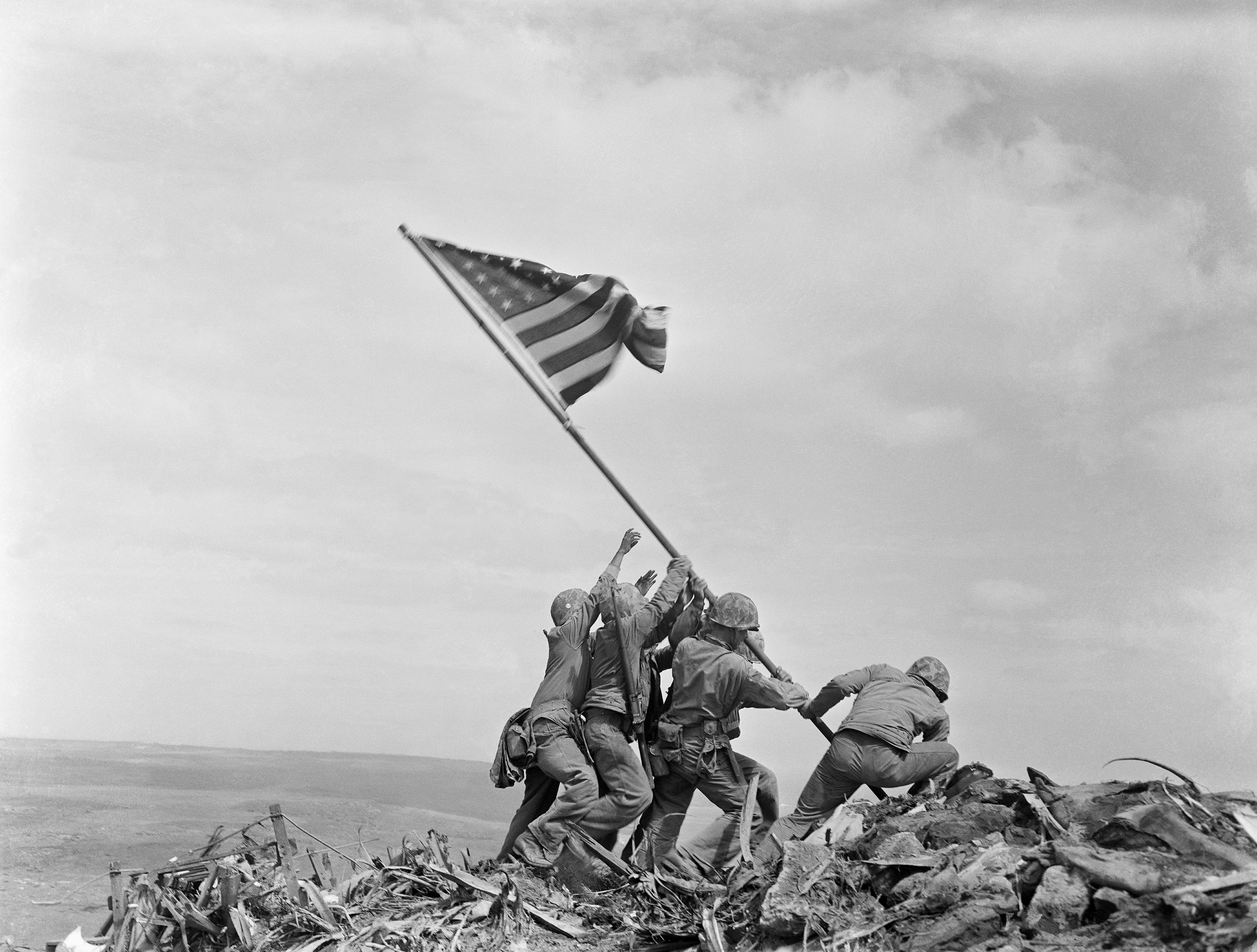
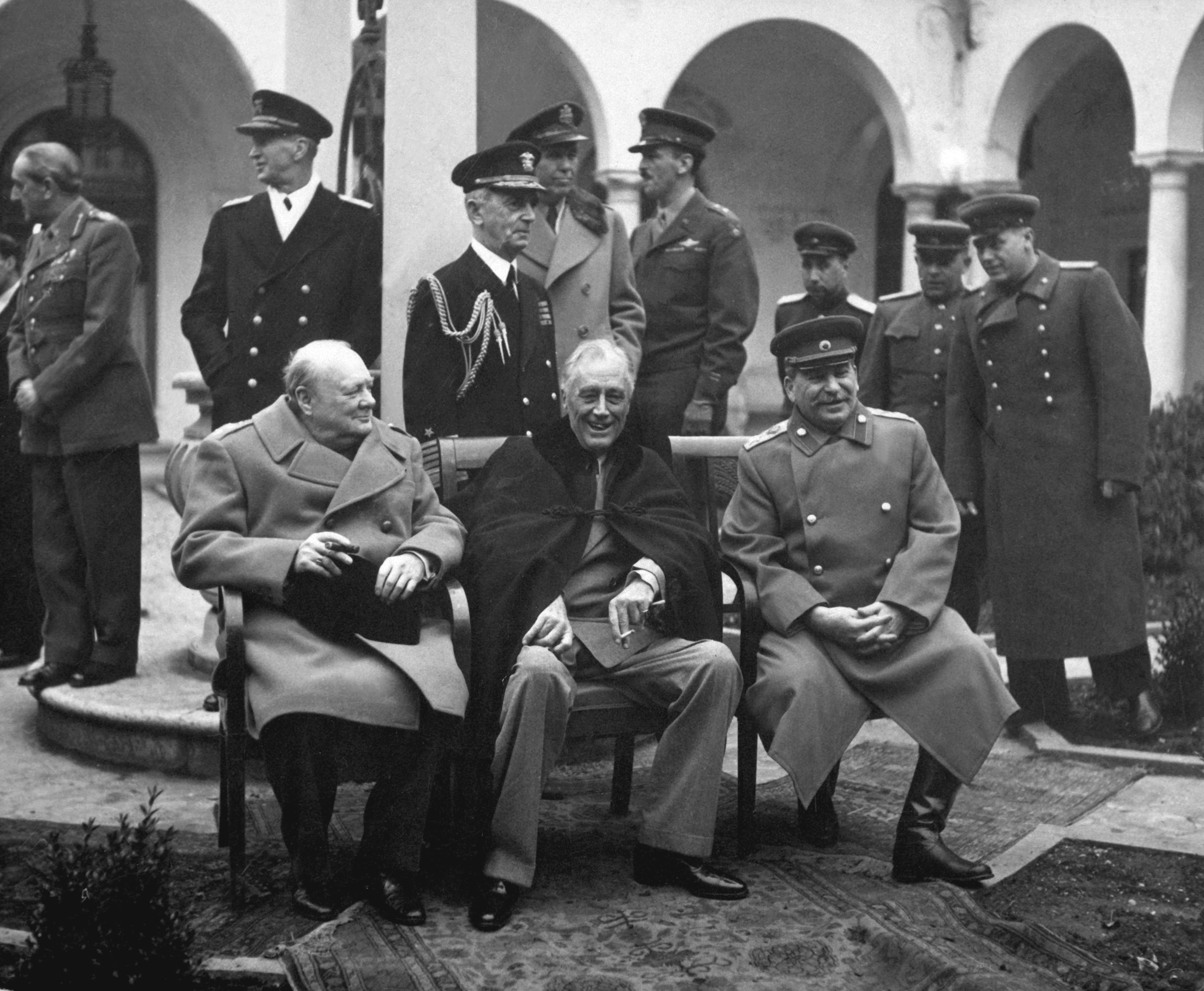
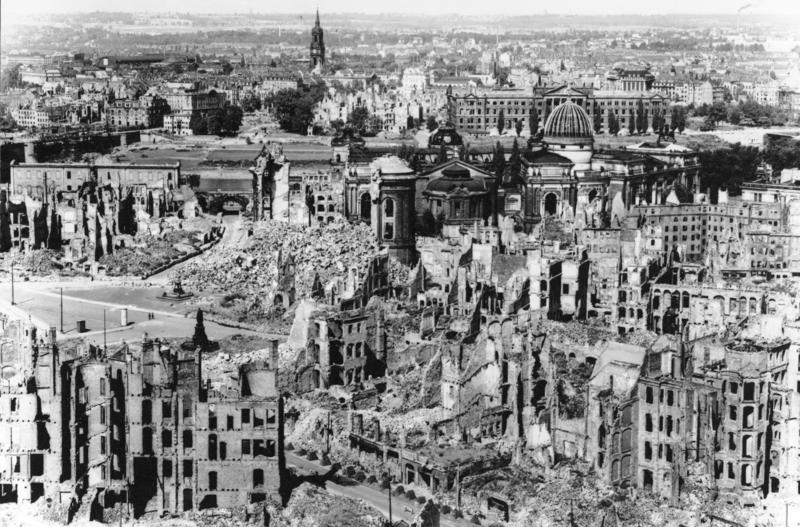
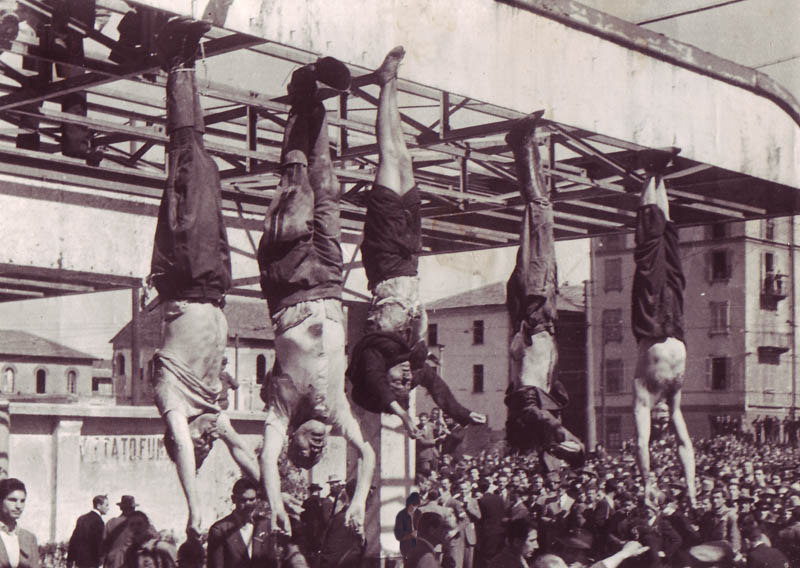
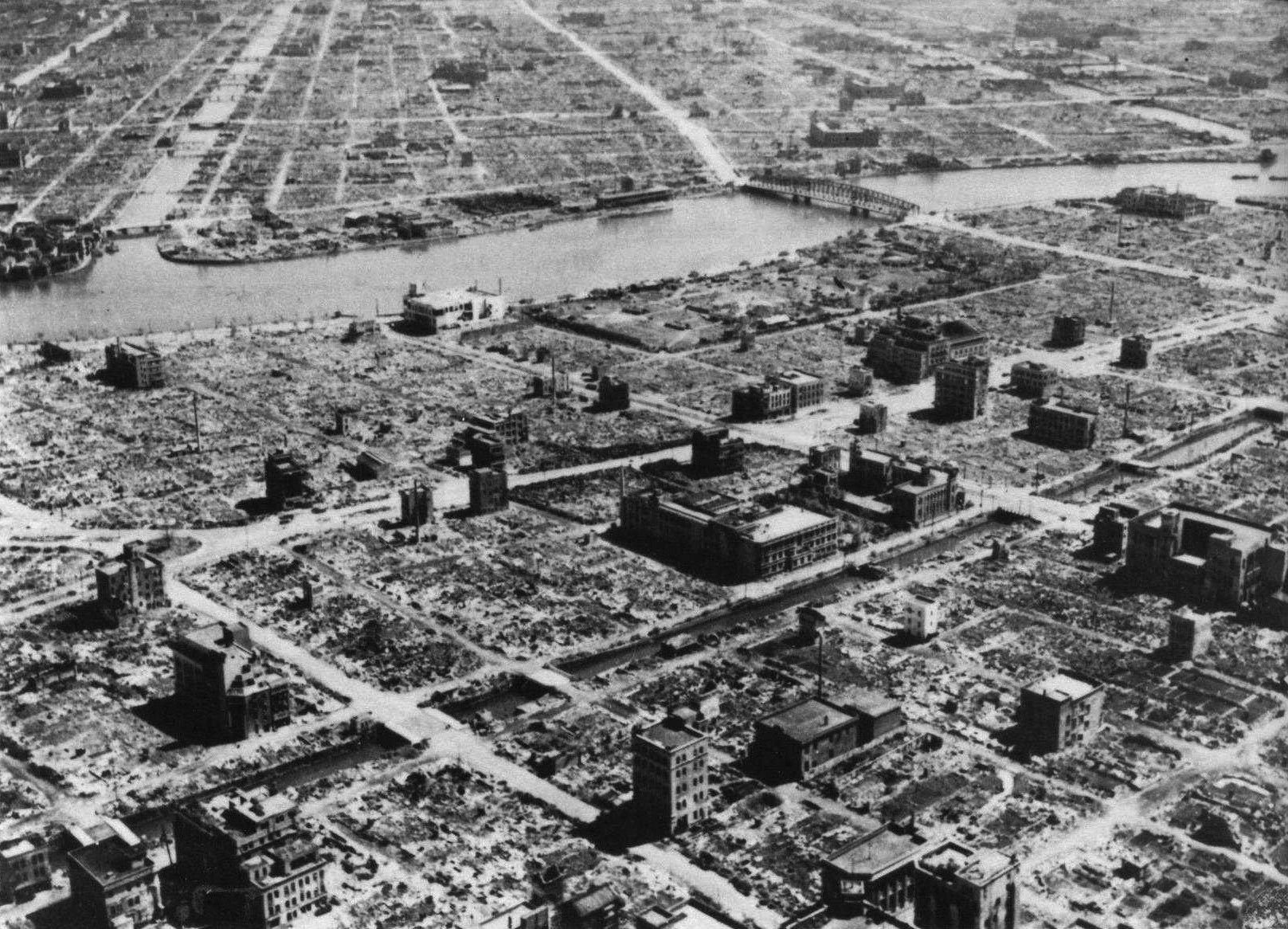
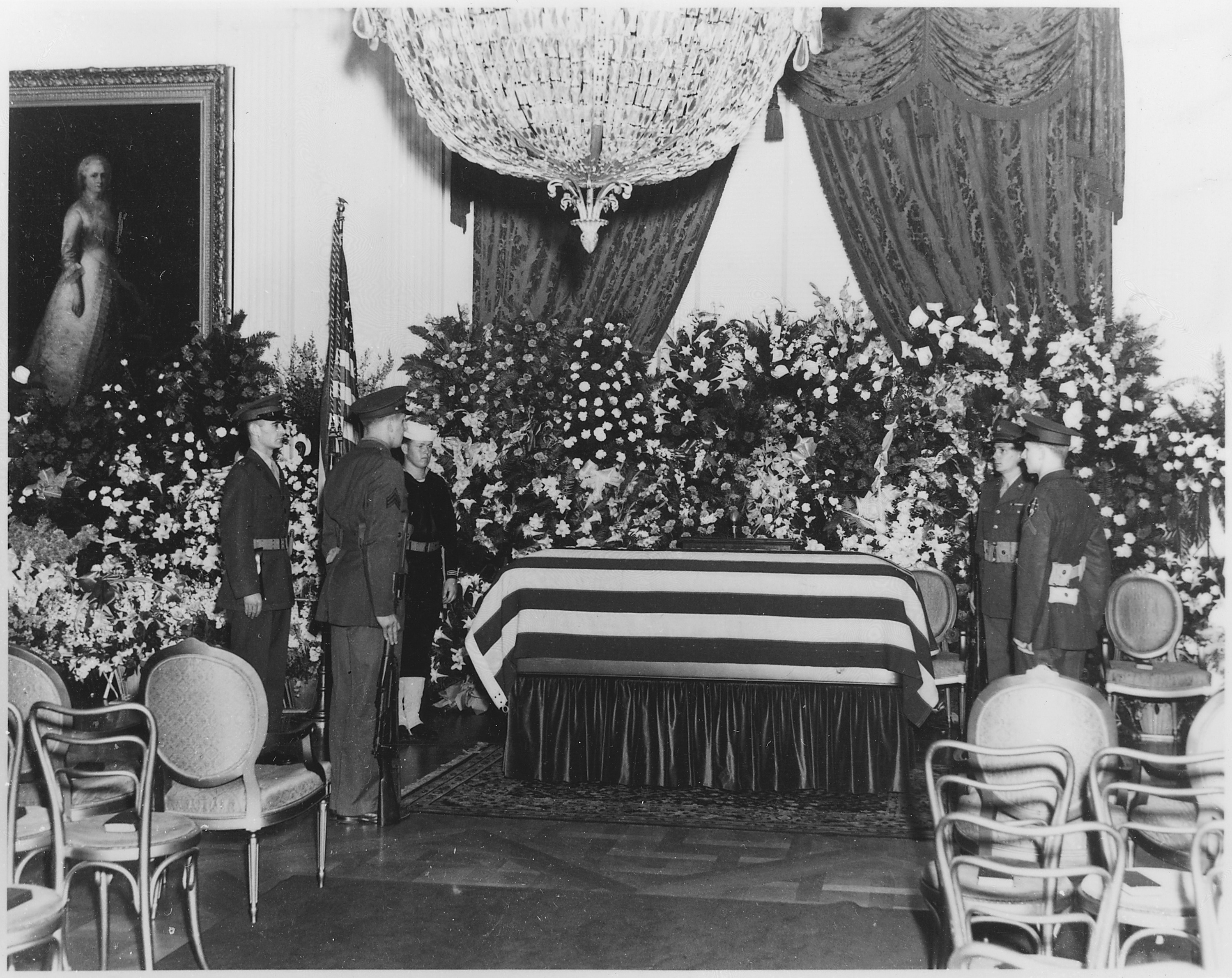
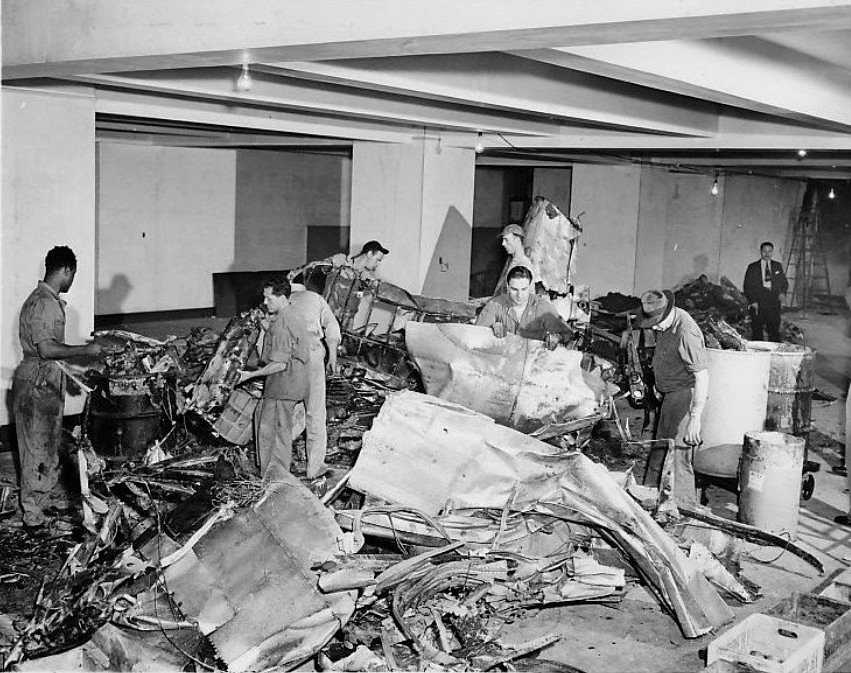
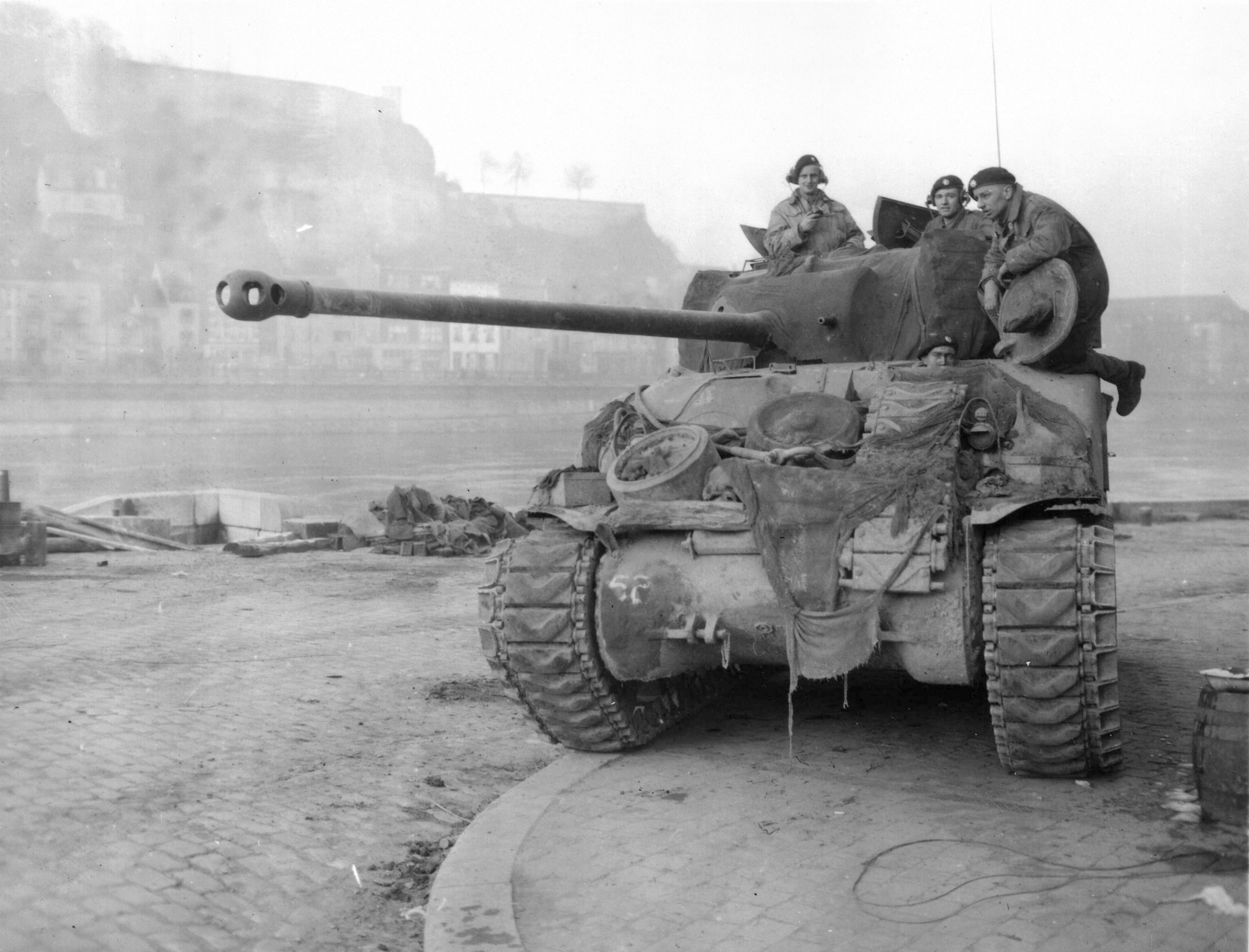
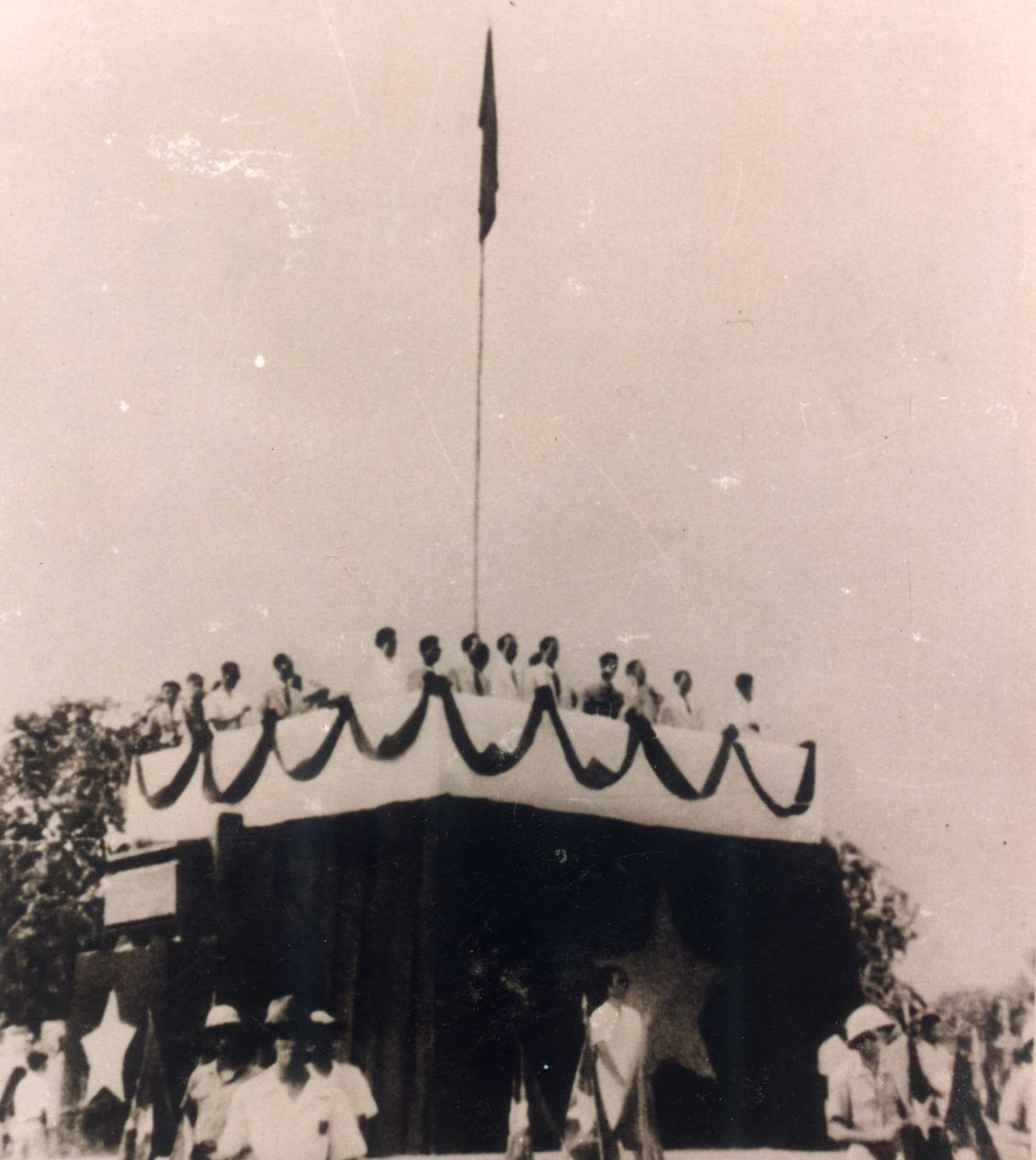
From top to bottom, left to right:
- The Atomic bombings of Hiroshima and Nagasaki devastate Japan and force the Surrender of Japan, ending World War II;
- The Battle of Berlin brings the fall of Nazi Germany, the death of Adolf Hitler, and the end of World War II in Europe;
- The Battle of Iwo Jima sees the United States capture a vital island after fierce fighting;
- The Yalta Conference unites Winston Churchill, Franklin D. Roosevelt, and Joseph Stalin to shape postwar Europe and establish the United Nations;
- The Bombing of Dresden levels the city with heavy civilian losses;
- The death of Benito Mussolini marks the collapse of Fascist Italy;
- The Bombing of Tokyo becomes one of the deadliest air raids of the war;
- The death of Franklin D. Roosevelt sees Harry S. Truman assume the U.S. presidency;
- 1945 Empire State Building B-25 crash in New York City, killing 14 people;
- A Sherman Firefly during the Battle of the Bulge, which ended in a decisive Allied victory;
- Ho Chi Minh reading the declaration of independence, establishing the Democratic Republic of Vietnam

1945 (MCMXLV) was a common year starting on Monday of the Gregorian calendar, the 1945th year of the Common Era (CE) and Anno Domini (AD) designations, the 945th year of the 2nd millennium, the 45th year of the 20th century, and the 6th year of the 1940s decade.

A turning point in human history, 1945 marked the end of World War II, ending with the defeat and occupation of Nazi Germany (including Austria) and the Empire of Japan (especially Korea) by the United States and the Soviet Union in the world of two superpowers. It is also the year the Nazi concentration camps were liberated and the only year in which atomic bombs (nukes) have been used in war (against the Japanese).

== Events ==
World War II will be abbreviated as "WWII"

=== January ===
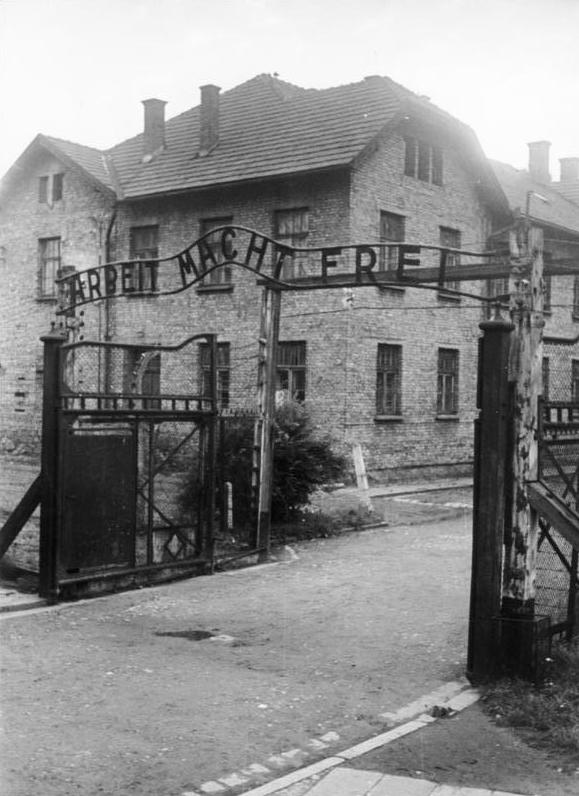
January 27 – The Soviet Red Army liberates Auschwitz.

- January 1 – WWII:
  - Germany begins Operation Bodenplatte, an attempt by the Luftwaffe to cripple Allied air forces in the Low Countries.
  - Chenogne massacre: German prisoners are allegedly killed by American forces near the village of Chenogne, Belgium.
- January 6 – WWII: A German offensive recaptures Esztergom, Hungary from the Soviets.
- January 9 – WWII: American and Australian troops land at Lingayen Gulf on western coast of the largest Philippine island of Luzon, occupied by Japan since 1942.
- January 12 – WWII: The Soviet Union begins the Vistula–Oder Offensive in Eastern Europe, against the German Army.
- January 13 – WWII: The Soviet Union begins the East Prussian Offensive, to eliminate German forces in East Prussia.
- January 16 – WWII: Adolf Hitler takes residence in the Führerbunker in Berlin.
- January 17
  - WWII: The Soviet Union occupies Warsaw, Poland.
  - The Holocaust: Swedish diplomat Raoul Wallenberg, who has saved thousands of Jews, is taken into custody by a Soviet patrol during the Siege of Budapest and is never again seen publicly.
- January 18 – The Holocaust: The SS begins the evacuation of Auschwitz concentration camp. Nearly 60,000 prisoners, mostly Jews, are forced to march to other locations in Germany; as many as 15,000 die. The 7,000 too sick to move are left without supplies being distributed.
- January 19 – The Holocaust: Soviet forces liberate the Łódź Ghetto; only 877 Jews of the initial population of 164,000 remain at this time.
- January 20 – Germany begins the Evacuation of East Prussia.
- January 21–22 (night) – At the Grünhagen railroad station, located in East Prussia at this date, two trains, heading for Elbing, collide. At dawn the station is reached by Soviet Army infantry and tanks which destroy the station, killing between 140 and 150 people.
- January 23 – WWII:
  - Hungary agrees to an armistice with the Allies.
  - German Grand Admiral Karl Dönitz orders the start of Operation Hannibal, the mass evacuation by sea of German troops and civilians from the Courland Pocket, East Prussia and the Polish Corridor, evacuating an estimated 800,000-900,000 German civilians and 350,000 soldiers from advancing Soviet forces.
  - Evacuation of Germans from Grünhagen.
- January 24 – WWII: AP war correspondent Joseph Morton, nine OSS men, and four SOE agents are executed by the Germans at Mauthausen concentration camp under Hitler's Commando Order of 1942, which stipulates the immediate execution of all captured Allied commandos or saboteurs without trial, even those in proper uniforms. Morton is the only Allied correspondent to be executed by the Axis during the war.
- January 25 – WWII: Hitler appoints Heinrich Himmler as commander of the hastily formed Army Group Vistula (Heeresgruppe Weichsel) to halt the Soviet Red Army's Vistula–Oder offensive into Pomerania, despite Himmler's lack of military experience.
- January 26 – WWII: 19-year-old U.S. Army Staff Sergeant Audie Murphy sees action at Holtzwihr, France, for which is awarded the Medal of Honor.
- January 27
  - The Holocaust: The Soviet Red Army liberates the Auschwitz and Birkenau concentration camps.
  - WWII: The Soviet Red Army reaches Wolf's Lair former Hitler headquarters.
- January 30 – WWII:
  - MV Wilhelm Gustloff, with over 10,000 mainly civilian Germans from Gotenhafen (Gdynia) is sunk in Gdańsk Bay by three torpedoes from Soviet submarine S-13 in the Baltic Sea; up to 9,400, 5,000 of whom are children, are thought to have died – the greatest loss of life in a single ship sinking in history.
  - Raid at Cabanatuan: 121 American soldiers and 800 Filipino guerrillas free 813 American prisoners of war from the Japanese-held camp in the city of Cabanatuan, in the Philippines.
  - Adolf Hitler makes his last public speech, on broadcast radio, expressing the belief that Germany will triumph.
- January 31 – WWII: The Battle of Hill 170 in the Burma Campaign ends with the British 3rd Commando Brigade defeating the Imperial Japanese Army 54th Division, causing the Japanese Twenty-Eighth Army to withdraw from the Arakan Peninsula.

=== February ===
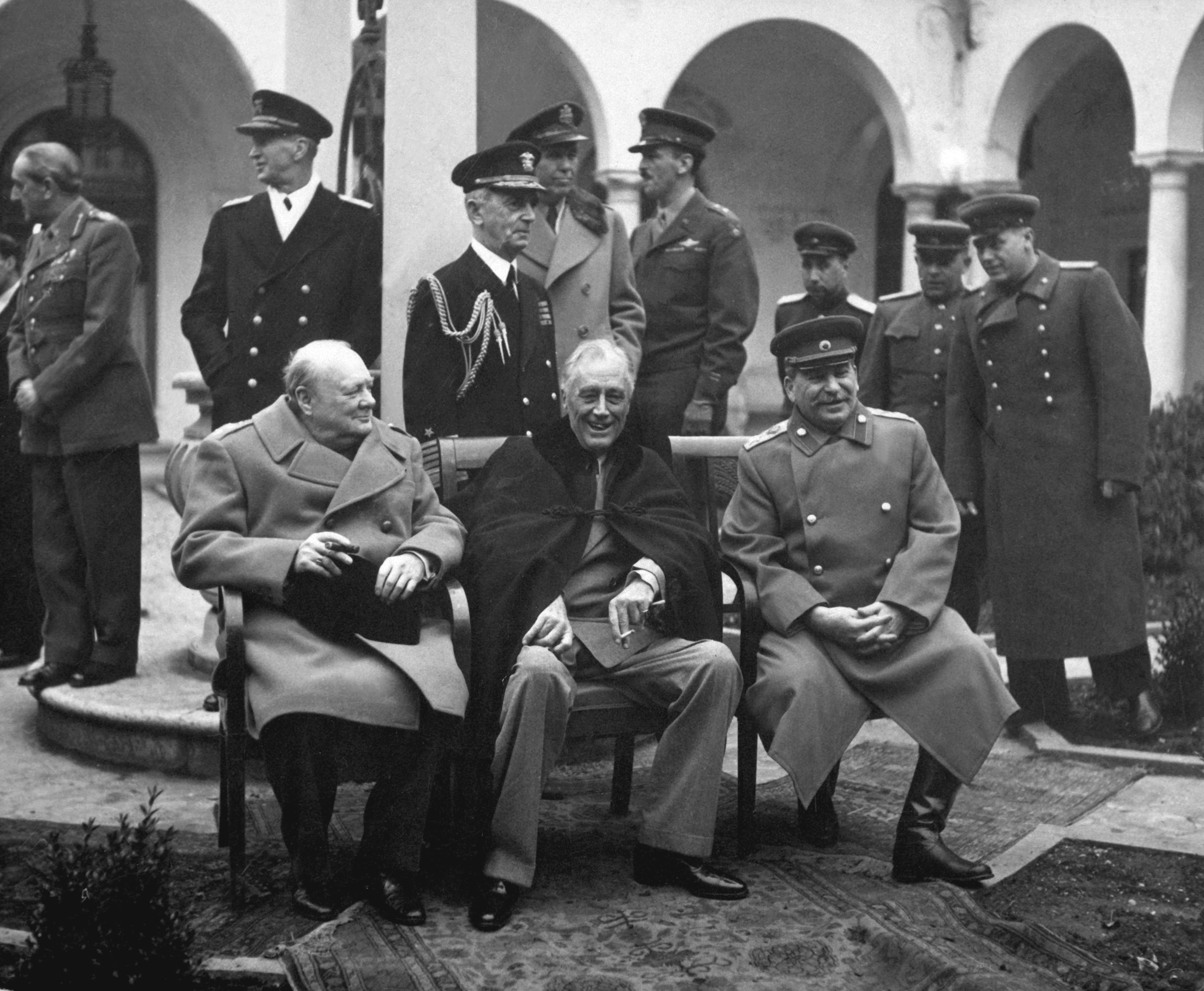
February 4 – The "Big Three" at the Yalta Conference: Winston Churchill, Franklin D. Roosevelt and Joseph Stalin.

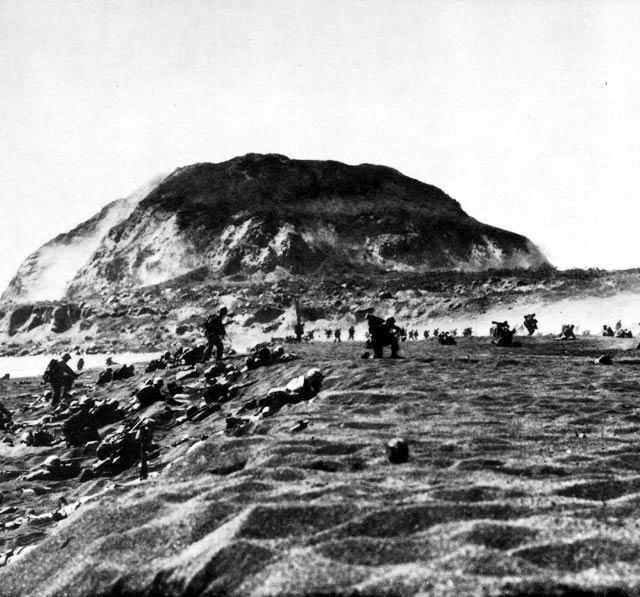
February 19 – During the Battle of Iwo Jima, U.S. Marines land on the island.

- February – Raymond L. Libby of American Cyanamid's research laboratories, at Stamford, Connecticut, announces a method of orally administering the antibiotic penicillin.
- February 3 – WWII:
  - Battle of Manila: United States forces enter the outskirts of Manila to capture it from the Japanese Imperial Army, starting the battle. On February 4, U.S. Army forces liberate Santo Tomas Internment Camp in the city.
  - The Soviet Union agrees to enter the Pacific War against Japan, once hostilities against Germany are concluded.
- February 4–11 – WWII: President Franklin D. Roosevelt, Prime Minister of the United Kingdom Winston Churchill and Soviet leader Joseph Stalin hold the Yalta Conference.
- February 7 – WWII: General Douglas MacArthur returns to Manila.
- February 8 – The Alaska Anti-Discrimination Act of 1945, championed by charismatic native leader Elizabeth Peratrovich, is passed by the territorial Senate, after the legislature defeated a previous bill in 1943.
- February 9
  - Walter Ulbricht becomes leader of the German Communists in Moscow.
  - WWII: "Black Friday": A force of Allied Bristol Beaufighter aircraft suffers heavy casualties in an unsuccessful attack on German destroyer Z33 and escorting vessels sheltering in Førde Fjord, Norway.
- February 10 – WWII: German troopship SS General von Steuben is sunk by the Soviet submarine S-13; 3,608 drown.
- February 10–20 – WWII: Operation Kita – The Imperial Japanese Navy returns "Completion Force", containing both its Ise-class battleships, safely from Singapore to Kure in Japan despite Allied attacks.
- February 12 – A devastating tornado outbreak in Mississippi and Alabama kills 45 people and injures 427 others.
- February 13 – WWII:
  - The Budapest Offensive and the Siege of Budapest end with Nazi troops surrendering Budapest (Hungary) to Soviet-Romanian forces.
  - Bombing of Dresden (Germany) by the British Royal Air Force and United States Army Air Forces; 25,000-35,000 are estimated to have died.
- February 16 – WWII:
  - The Bombing of Wesel begins, destroying 97% of the town over three days.
  - American and Filipino ground forces land on Corregidor Island in the Philippines.
  - Combined American and Filipino forces recapture the Bataan Peninsula.
  - Venezuela declares war on Germany.
- February 18–March 5 – WWII: American and Brazilian troops kick off Operation Encore in Northern Italy, a successful limited action in the Northern Apennines that prepares for the western portion of the Allied Spring offensive.
- February 19–20 – 980 (actual figure is disputed) Japanese soldiers die as a result of being attacked by long saltwater crocodiles in Ramree, Burma.
- February 19 – WWII: Battle of Iwo Jima – About 30,000 United States Marines land on Iwo Jima.
- February 21 – The last V-2 rocket is launched from Peenemünde.
- February 22 – WWII:
  - Italian Front: The Battle of Monte Castello ends after nearly three months of fighting when the Brazilian Expeditionary Force expels German forces from a pivot point in the (Tuscan) North Apennines where their artillery was impeding the advance of the British Eighth Army toward Bologna.
  - Uruguay declares war on Germany and Japan.
- February 23 – WWII:
  - Battle of Iwo Jima: A group of United States Marines reach the top of Mount Suribachi on the island, and are photographed raising the American flag. The photo, Raising the Flag on Iwo Jima (taken by Joe Rosenthal), later wins a Pulitzer Prize.
  - The US Army 11th Airborne Division, with Filipino guerrillas, free the captives of the Los Baños internment camp.
  - The capital of the Philippines, Manila, is liberated by combined American and Filipino ground troops. The suburb of Intramuros is devastated.
  - The German garrison in Poznań capitulates to Red Army and Polish troops.
  - Bombing of Pforzheim: The heaviest of a series of bombing raids on Pforzheim, Germany, by Allied aircraft is carried out by the British Royal Air Force. As many as 17,600 people, or 31.4% of the town's population, are killed in the raid and about 83% of the town's buildings destroyed, two-thirds of its complete area and between 80 and 100% of the inner city.
  - Turkey joins the war on the side of the Allies.
- February 24 – Egyptian premier Ahmad Mahir Pasha is assassinated in Parliament after declaring war on Germany and Japan.
- February 27 – The Bombing of Mainz results in 1,209 confirmed dead; 80% of the city is destroyed.
- February 28 – In Bucharest, a violent demonstration takes place, during which the Bolşevic group opens fire on the army and protesters. In response, Andrei Y. Vishinsky, USSR vice commissioner of foreign affairs and president of the Allied Control Commission for Romania, travels to Bucharest to compel Nicolae Rădescu to resign as premier.

=== March ===
- March 1 – President Franklin D. Roosevelt gives what will be his last address to a joint session of the United States Congress, reporting on the Yalta Conference.
- March 2
  - Former U.S. vice-president Henry A. Wallace starts his term of office as United States Secretary of Commerce, serving under President Franklin D. Roosevelt.
  - The rocket-propelled Bachem Ba 349 Natter is first test launched at Stetten am kalten Markt. The launch fails and the pilot, Lothar Sieber, dies.
  - WWII: Allied troops led by 10th Armored Division capture Trier, the oldest city in Germany.
- March 3 – WWII:
  - Finland declares war on the Axis powers.
  - United States and Filipino troops take Manila, Philippines.
  - Pawłokoma massacre: A Polish Home Army unit massacres between 150 and 500 Ukrainian civilians in the Polish village of Pawłokoma.
  - Bombing of the Bezuidenhout: The British Royal Air Force accidentally bombs the Bezuidenhout neighbourhood in The Hague, Netherlands, killing 511 people.
- March 4
  - In the United Kingdom, Princess Elizabeth (later Queen Elizabeth II), joins the Auxiliary Territorial Service (ATS) as a truck driver/mechanic in London.
  - The Swiss cities of Basel and Zürich are accidentally bombed by the United States.
- March 5 – WWII: Brazilian troops take Castelnuovo (Vergato) in the last operations of the Allied Operation Encore.
- March 6
  - A Communist-led government is formed in Romania under Petru Groza, following Soviet intervention.
  - Resistance fighters accidentally ambush and attempt to execute SS general Hanns Albin Rauter, the arch-persecutor of the Dutch.
- March 7
  - WWII: At the end of Operation Lumberjack, American troops seize the Ludendorff Bridge over the Rhine at Remagen, Germany and begin to cross; in the next 10 days, 25,000 troops with equipment are able to cross.
  - 10th Armored Division captures the city of Cologne.
- March 8
  - Josip Broz Tito forms a Provisional Government of the Democratic Federal Yugoslavia, in the Kingdom of Yugoslavia.
  - Nazi authorities kill 117 Dutch men in reprisal for the attempted murder of Hanns Albin Rauter.
  - Operation Sunrise: Waffen-SS General Karl Wolff meets with Allen Welsh Dulles of the United States Office of Strategic Services at Lucerne, Switzerland, to negotiate the surrender of the Axis forces in Italy to the Allies.
- March 9–10 – WWII: Bombing of Tokyo: USAAF B-29 bombers attack Tokyo, Japan with incendiary bombs, killing 100,000 citizens in the firebombing. It is the single most destructive conventional air attack of the war.
- March 11
  - The Empire of Japan establishes the Empire of Vietnam, a puppet state which will last only until August 23, with Bảo Đại as its ruler.
  - The Sammarinese general election gives San Marino the world's first democratically elected communist government, which will hold power until 1957.
- March 12 – WWII: Swinemünde is destroyed by the USAAF, killing an estimated 8,000 to 23,000 civilians, mostly refugees saved by Operation Hannibal.
- March 15–31 – WWII: The Soviet Red Army carries out the Upper Silesian Offensive.
- March 15 – The 17th Academy Awards ceremony is held, broadcast via radio in the United States for the first time. Best Picture goes to Going My Way.
- March 16 – WWII:
  - The Battle of Iwo Jima unofficially ends.
  - The Bombing of Würzburg, as part of the Allied strategic bombing campaign against Nazi Germany, destroys 89% of the city and causes 4,000 deaths.
- March 17 – WWII: Kobe, Japan is fire-bombed by 331 B-29 bombers, killing over 8,000 people.
- March 18 – WWII:
  - The 40th Infantry Division, spearheaded by the 185th US Infantry Regiment, lands unopposed in Tigbauan forcing the Japanese forces to surrender and Generals Macario Peralta and Eichelberger to declare the Liberation of Panay, Romblon and Guimaras.
  - 1,250 American bombers attack Berlin.
  - Battle of Kolberg concludes with the Baltic seaport (designated a key Festung (fortress) by the Germans) taken by Polish and Soviet forces and ethnic Germans evacuated or expelled.
- March 19 – WWII:
  - Adolf Hitler issues the "Nero Decree" ordering that all industries, military installations, machine shops, transportation facilities and communications facilities in Germany be destroyed ahead of Allied advances, but Albert Speer, placed in charge of the implementation, deliberately disobeys it.
  - Off the coast of Japan, bombers hit the aircraft carrier USS Franklin, killing about 800 of her crewmen and crippling the ship.
- March 20 – WWII: Hitler dismisses Heinrich Himmler from his military command.
- March 21 – WWII:
  - Burma campaign: Battle of Meiktila and Mandalay – British and Indian troops officially liberate the city of Mandalay from the Japanese in Burma.
  - Bulgarian and Soviet troops successfully defend the north bank of the Drava River, as the Battle of the Transdanubian Hills concludes.
- March 22
  - The Arab League is formed, with the adoption of a charter in Cairo, Egypt.
  - The Cathedral and the historic centre of Hildesheim in Germany are destroyed in a bombing of the city.
- March 24
  - WWII: Operation Varsity – Two airborne divisions capture bridges across the river Rhine to aid the Allied advance.
  - The cartoon character Sylvester the cat debuts in Life with Feathers.
- March 26 – WWII: The Battle of Iwo Jima officially ends, with the destruction of the remaining areas of Japanese resistance, although there are Japanese holdouts here until 1949.
- March 27 – WWII:
  - The United States Army Air Forces begins Operation Starvation, laying naval mines in many of Japan's seaways.
  - Argentina declares war on Germany and Japan.
- March 29
  - WWII: The Red Army almost destroys the German 4th Army in the Heiligenbeil Pocket in East Prussia.
  - WWII: American troops led by 5th Infantry Division and 6th Armored Division capture the city of Frankfurt after three days of battle.
  - The "Clash of Titans": George Mikan and Bob Kurland duel at Madison Square Garden in New York, as Oklahoma State University defeats DePaul 52–44 in basketball.
- March 30 – WWII:
  - The Red Army pushes most of the Axis forces out of Hungary into Austria.
  - American official Alger Hiss is congratulated in Moscow for his part in bringing the positions of the Western powers and the Soviet Union closer to each other at the Yalta Conference.

=== April ===
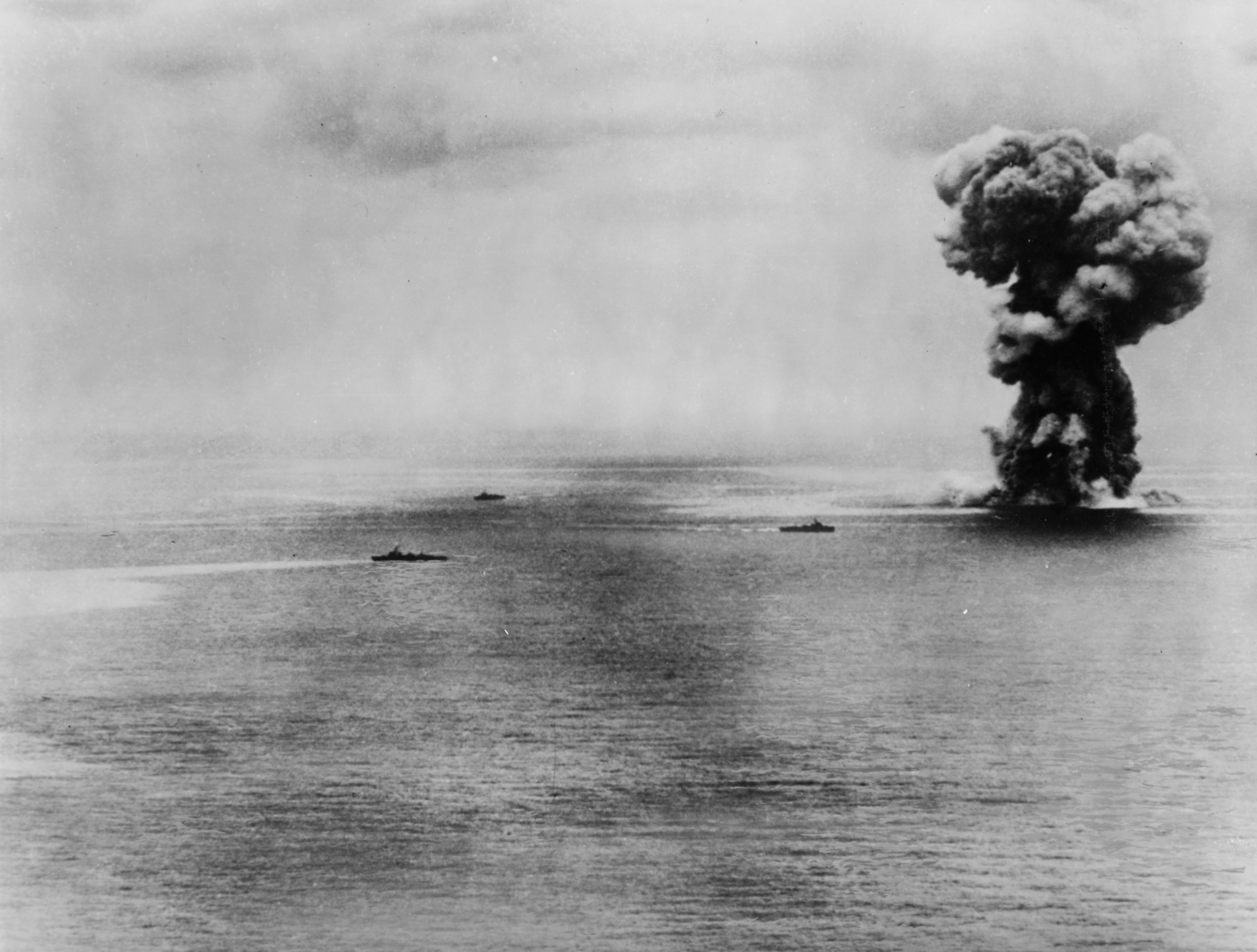
April 7 – Japanese battleship Yamato explodes after persistent attacks from U.S. aircraft during the Battle of Okinawa.

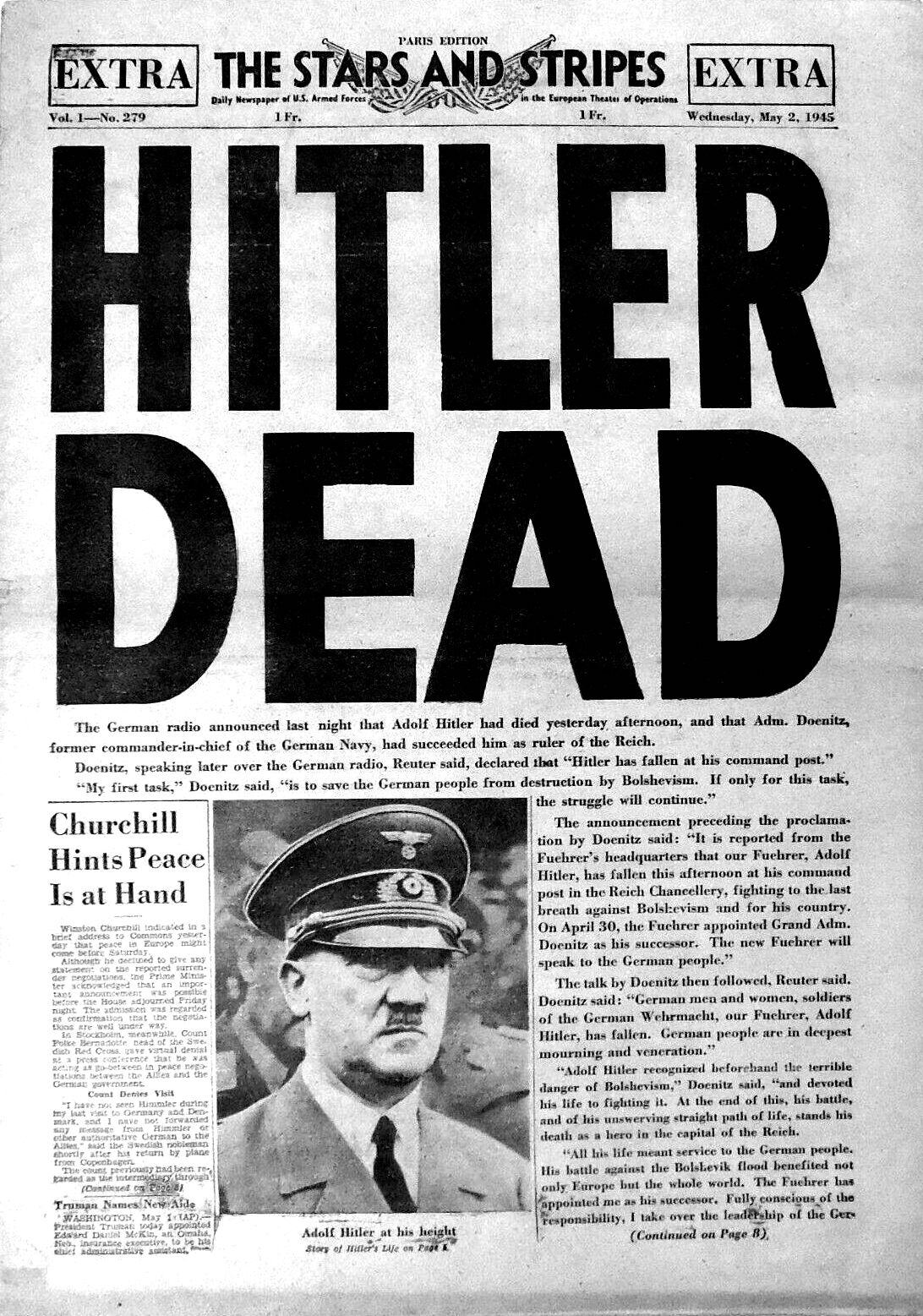
April 30 – Adolf Hitler, along with his wife of one day Eva Braun, commits suicide.

- April 1 – WWII: Battle of Okinawa: The Tenth United States Army lands on Okinawa.
- April 4 – WWII:
  - American troops liberate their first Nazi concentration camp, Ohrdruf extermination camp, a subcamp of the Buchenwald concentration camp in Germany.
  - The Soviet Red Army enters Bratislava and pushes to the outskirts of Vienna, taking it on April 13, after several days of intense fighting.
- April 6 – WWII:
  - Sarajevo is liberated from Nazi Germany and the Independent State of Croatia (a fascist puppet state) by Yugoslav Partisans.
  - The Battle of Slater's Knoll on Bougainville Island concludes with a decisive victory for the Australian Army's 7th Brigade.
- April 7 – WWII:
  - The only flight of the German ramming unit known as Sonderkommando Elbe takes place, resulting in the loss of some 24 B-17s and B-24s of the United States Eighth Air Force.
  - Japanese battleship Yamato and nine other warships take part in Operation Ten-Go, a suicide attack on Allied forces engaged in the Battle of Okinawa. Yamato is sunk by U.S. Navy aircraft in the East China Sea 200 miles (320 km) north of Okinawa with the loss of 2,055 of 2,332 crew, together with five other Japanese warships.
  - Kantarō Suzuki becomes Prime Minister of Japan.
- April 8 – The SS begins to evacuate the Buchenwald concentration camp; inmates in the Buchenwald Resistance call for American aid, and overpower and kill the remaining guards.
- April 9
  - WWII: The Battle of Königsberg, in East Prussia, ends with Soviet forces capturing the city.
  - Abwehr conspirators Wilhelm Canaris, Hans Oster and Hans von Dohnányi are hanged at Flossenbürg concentration camp, along with pastor Dietrich Bonhoeffer and other people associated with resistance groups. Johann Georg Elser, would-be assassin of Adolf Hitler, is executed at Dachau concentration camp.
- April 10 – WWII:
  - Visoko is liberated by the 7th, 9th and 17th Krajina Brigades from the Tenth Division of Yugoslav Partisan forces.
  - The city of Hanover is captured by American troops led by the 84th Division after thousands of German troops surrender.
- April 11 – Buchenwald concentration camp is liberated by the United States Army.
- April 12
  - Vice President Harry S. Truman becomes the 33rd president of the United States upon the death of President Franklin D. Roosevelt at the Little White House in Warm Springs, Georgia of an intracerebral hemorrhage.
  - WWII: Allied forces reach Merkers Salt Mines in Thuringia where gold reserves of the Nazi German Reichsbank and art treasures are stored.
  - A devastating tornado outbreak occurs across the United States, which kills 128 people and injures over 1,000 others. This is heavily overshadowed by the death of President Roosevelt.
  - WWII: The U.S. Ninth Army under General William H. Simpson crosses the Elbe River astride Magdeburg, and reaches Tangermünde — only 50 miles from Berlin.
  - Richard Strauss completes composition of his Metamorphosen.
- April 14 – WWII:
  - The First Canadian Army assumes military control of the Netherlands, where German forces are trapped in the Atlantic Wall fortifications along the coastline.
  - Razing of Friesoythe: The 4th Canadian (Armoured) Division deliberately destroys the German town of Friesoythe, on the orders of Major General Christopher Vokes.
  - Bombing of Potsdam.
- April 15 – WWII:
  - The Bergen-Belsen concentration camp is liberated by British and Canadian forces.
  - The Canadian First Army reaches the coast in the northern Netherlands, and captures Arnhem.
- April 16 – WWII:
  - The Battle of Berlin begins, opening with the Red Army launching the Battle of the Oder–Neisse and the Battle of the Seelow Heights.
  - Canadian forces take Harlingen and occupy Leeuwarden and Groningen in the Netherlands.
  - MV Goya is sunk by Soviet submarine L-3 in the Baltic Sea while evacuating German troops and civilians as part of Operation Hannibal; 7,000–8,000 drown.
  - Death marches from Flossenbürg concentration camp begin.
- April 17 – WWII:
  - Battle of Montese: Brazilian forces liberate the town of Montese, Italy, from German forces.
  - Inundation of the Wieringermeer in the Netherlands by occupying German forces.
- April 18 – American war correspondent Ernie Pyle is killed by Japanese machine gun fire on the island of Ie Shima off Okinawa.
- April 19 – Rodgers and Hammerstein's Carousel, a musical play based on Ferenc Molnár's Liliom, opens on Broadway, and becomes their second long-running stage classic. It includes the standard "You'll Never Walk Alone".
- April 20 – WWII:
  - On his 56th birthday, Adolf Hitler leaves his Führerbunker, to decorate a group of Hitler Youth soldiers in Berlin. It will be his last trip to the surface from his underground bunker.
  - The German city of Nuremberg, previously the site of the Nuremberg rallies, is occupied by American troops.
  - American troops led by 2nd Infantry Division and 69th Infantry Division capture the city of Leipzig.
  - "Morotai Mutiny": members of the Australian First Tactical Air Force based on the island of Morotai in the Dutch East Indies tender their resignations to protest their belief that they are being assigned to missions of no military importance and in which they are not specialists; a subsequent inquiry effectively vindicates them.
- April 22 – WWII:
  - Heinrich Himmler, through Folke Bernadotte, Count of Wisborg, puts forth an offer of German surrender to the Western Allies, but not the Soviet Union.
  - Adolf Hitler finally concedes that "everything is lost" at a meeting in the Führerbunker after learning that SS-Obergruppenführer Felix Steiner cannot mobilize enough men to launch a counterattack on the Soviet forces which are surrounding Berlin.
- April 23 – WWII:
  - Hermann Göring sends the Göring telegram to Hitler, seeking confirmation that he should take over leadership of Germany, in accordance with the decree of June 29, 1941. Hitler regards this as treason.
  - The main Flossenbürg concentration camp is liberated by the United States Army.
- April 24 – WWII:
  - Battle of Berlin: Red Army troops complete encirclement of Berlin.
  - Retreating German troops destroy all the bridges over the Adige in Verona, including the historic Ponte di Castelvecchio and Ponte Pietra.
- April 25
  - Founding negotiations for the United Nations begin in San Francisco.
  - WWII – Elbe Day: American and Soviet troops link up at the river Elbe, cutting Germany in two.
- April 25–26 – WWII: The last major strategic bombing raid by RAF Bomber Command, the destruction of the oil refinery at Tønsberg in southern Norway, is carried out by 107 Avro Lancasters.
- April 26 – WWII:
  - Battle of Bautzen: The last "successful" German panzer-offensive in Bautzen ends with the city recaptured.
  - The British 3rd Infantry Division, under General Whistler, captures Bremen.
  - Nazi surrenders mean the British and Canadians now control the German border with Switzerland, from Basel to Lake Constance.
- April 27
  - The last German formations withdraw from Finland to Norway. The Lapland War and thus, World War II in Finland, comes to an end and the Raising the Flag on the Three-Country Cairn photograph is taken.
  - The provisional government of Austria headed by Karl Renner asserts its independence from Germany.
  - U.S. Ordnance troops find the coffins of Frederick William I of Prussia, Frederick the Great, Paul von Hindenburg and his wife in a salt mine in Germany.
- April 28
  - The bodies of Benito Mussolini, his mistress, Clara Petacci, and other followers are hung by their heels at a gas station in the public square of Milan, Piazzale Loreto, following their execution by Italian partisans after an attempt to flee the country.
  - The Canadian First Army captures Emden and Wilhelmshaven.
- April 29
  - At the royal palace in Caserta, Lieutenant-Colonel Viktor von Schweinitz (representing General Heinrich von Vietinghoff) and SS-Obersturmbannführer Eugen Wenner (representing Waffen-SS General Karl Wolff) sign an unconditional instrument of surrender for all Axis powers forces in Italy, taking effect on May 2. Italian General Rodolfo Graziani orders the Esercito Nazionale Repubblicano forces under his command to lay down their arms.
  - Dachau concentration camp is surrendered to U.S. forces, who kill SS guards at the camp and the nearby hamlet of Webling.
  - Brazilian forces liberate the commune of Fornovo di Taro, Italy, from German forces.
  - Operation Manna: British Avro Lancaster bombers drop food into the Netherlands to prevent the starvation of the civilian population.
  - Soviet soldiers hoist the Red flag over the Reich Chancellery in Berlin.
  - Adolf Hitler marries his longtime mistress Eva Braun, in a closed civil ceremony in the Berlin Führerbunker, and signs his last will and testament.
- April 30 – WWII:
  - Death of Adolf Hitler: Adolf Hitler and his wife of one day, Eva Braun, commit suicide as the Red Army approaches the Führerbunker in Berlin. Großadmiral Karl Dönitz succeeds Hitler as Reichspräsident (President of Germany) and Joseph Goebbels succeeds as Reichskanzler (Chancellor of Germany), in accordance with Hitler's political testament the day earlier.
  - American forces enter the Bavarian capital of Munich.

=== May ===
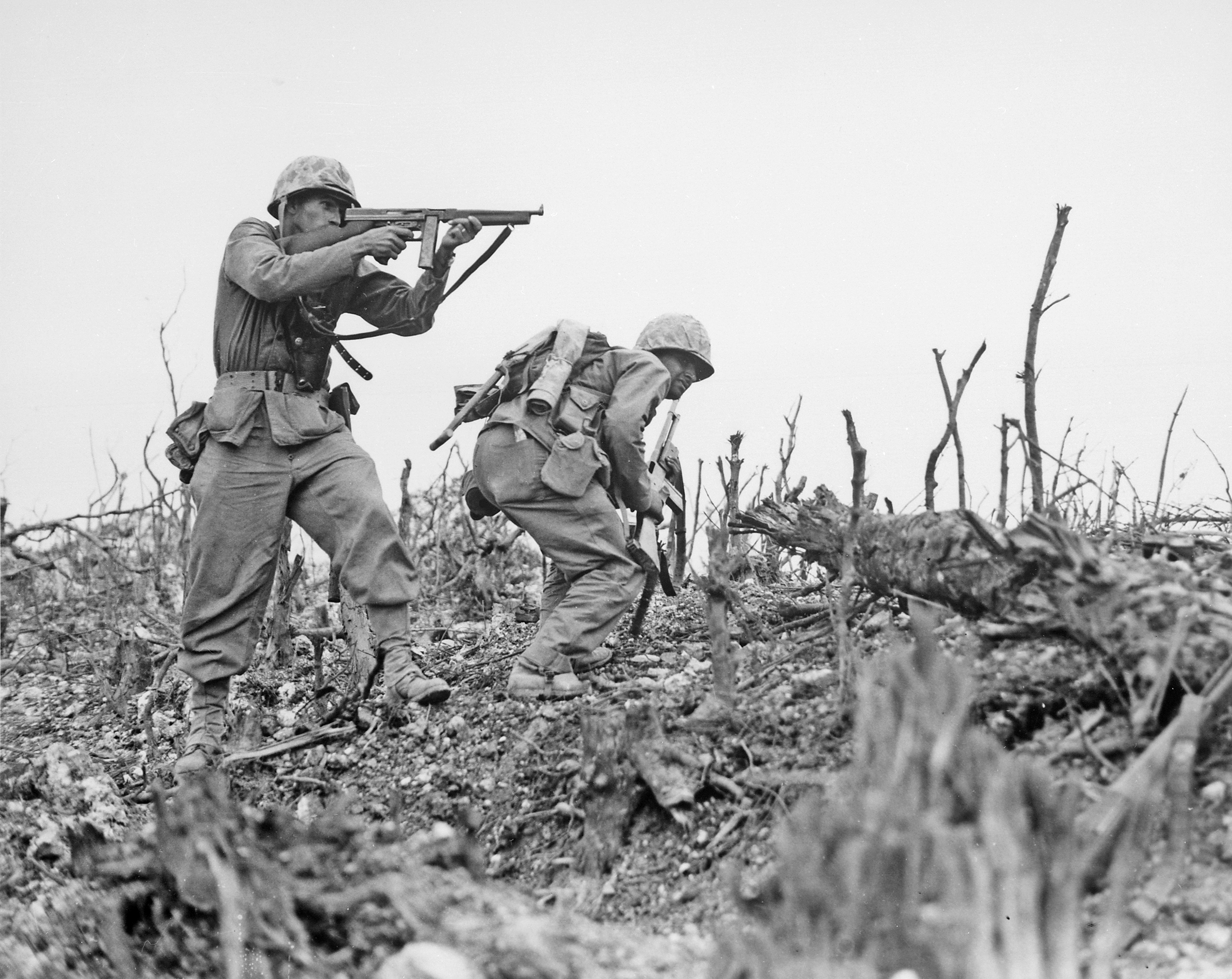
May – Marines of 1st Marine Division fighting on Okinawa.

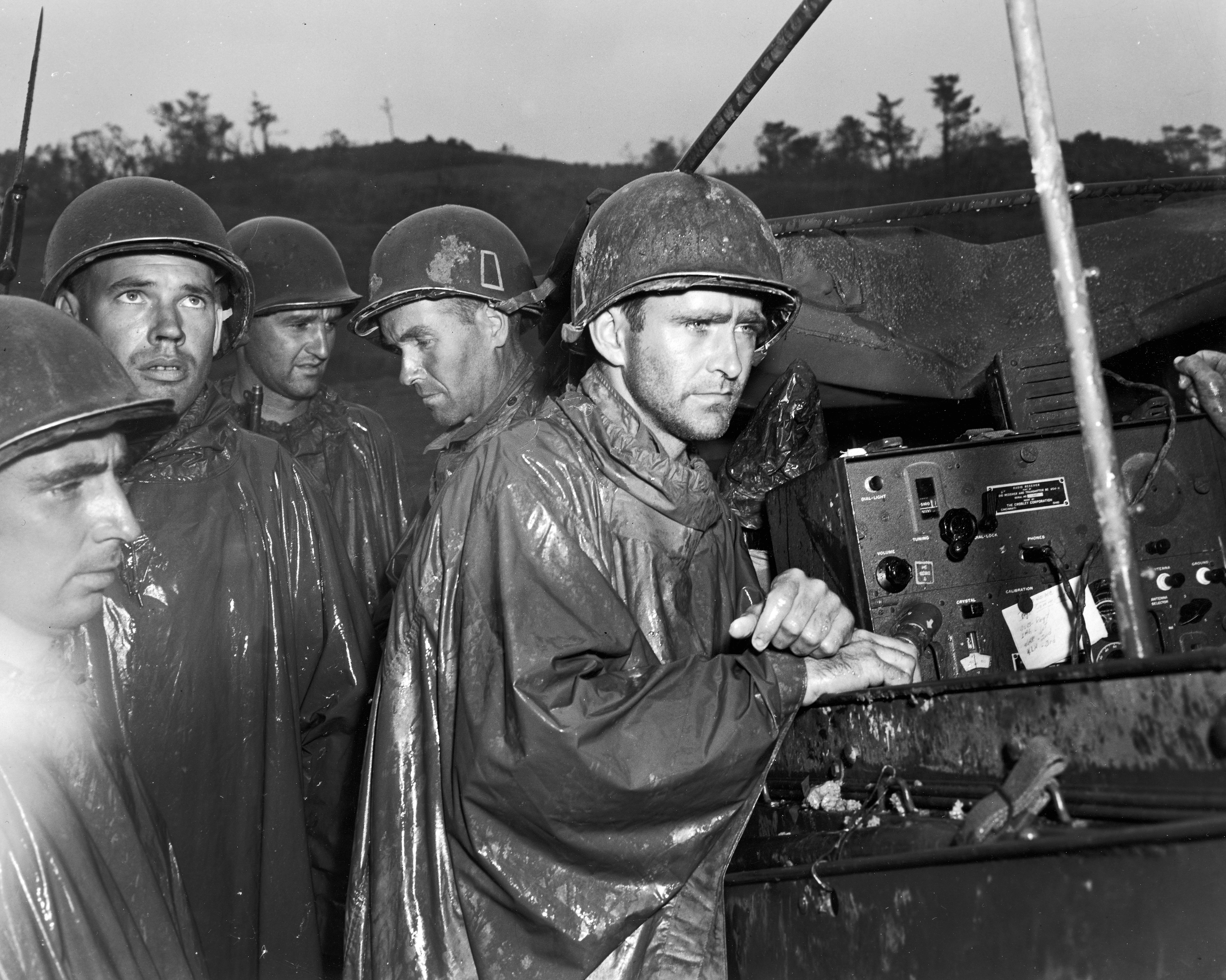
May 8 – American soldiers fighting in the Pacific theater listen to radio reports of Victory in Europe Day.

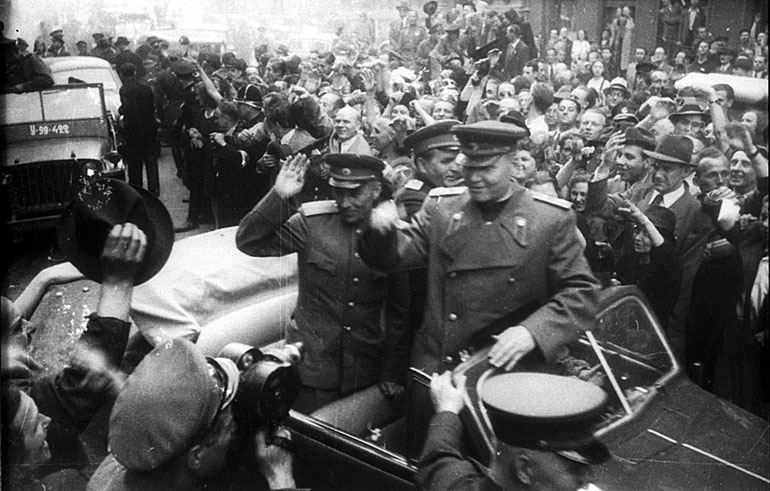
May 9 – Prague is liberated by the Red Army.

- May
  - Expulsion of Germans from Czechoslovakia begins.
  - Interpol (being headquartered in Berlin) effectively ceases to exist (it is recreated on June 3, 1946).
- May 1 – WWII:
  - Reichssender Hamburg's Flensburg radio station announces that Hitler has died in battle, "fighting up to his last breath against Bolshevism."
  - Joseph Goebbels carries out his sole official act as Chancellor of Germany, dictating a letter to the Soviet commander in Berlin advising of Hitler's death and requesting a ceasefire. When the latter is refused, he and his wife Magda kill their six children and commit suicide themselves. Karl Dönitz appoints Lutz Graf Schwerin von Krosigk as the new de facto Chancellor of Germany, in the Flensburg Government.
  - Troops of the Yugoslav 4th Army, together with the Slovene 9th Corpus NOV, enter Trieste.
  - Mass suicide in Demmin: An estimated 700–2,500 suicides take place, after 80% of the town has been destroyed by the Soviets during the past three days.
- May 2 – WWII:
  - The Soviet Union announces the fall of Berlin. The famous picture of Raising a Flag over the Reichstag is taken at this date.
  - Lübeck is liberated by the British Army.
  - The surrender of Axis troops in Italy comes into effect.
  - A Holocaust death march from Dachau to the Austrian border is halted under two kilometers west of Waakirchen by the segregated, all-Nisei 522nd Field Artillery Battalion of the U.S. Army in southern Bavaria, saving several hundred prisoners.
  - Troops of the New Zealand Army 2nd Division enter Trieste a day after the Yugoslavs; the German Army in the city surrenders to the New Zealanders.
  - Following the death or resignation of the Hitler Cabinet in Germany, the Schwerin von Krosigk cabinet first meets.
  - Neuengamme concentration camp near Hamburg is evacuated at about this date.
  - Expatriate American poet Ezra Pound is arrested by the Italian resistance movement but soon released by them as of no interest; on May 5 he turns himself in to the United States Army and is imprisoned as a traitor.
- May 3 – WWII:
  - The prison ships Cap Arcona (5,000 dead), Thielbek (2,750 dead) and Deutschland (all survive) are sunk by the British Royal Air Force in Lübeck Bay.
  - Rocket scientist Wernher von Braun and 120 members of his team surrender to U.S. forces (later going on to help start the U.S. space program).
  - German Protestant theologian Gerhard Kittel is arrested by the French forces in Tübingen, Germany.
  - Operation Dracula: British troops liberate the Burmese capital of Rangoon from Japanese forces.
  - Capture of Hamburg: British troops of VIII Corps and XII Corps capture city of Hamburg
- May 4 – WWII:
  - German surrender at Lüneburg Heath: All German armed forces in northwest Germany, Denmark and the Netherlands surrender unconditionally to British Field Marshal Bernard Montgomery, effective on May 5 at 08:00 hours British Double (and German) Summer Time.
  - The Netherlands is liberated by British and Canadian troops.
  - Denmark is liberated.
  - Admiral Karl Dönitz orders all U-boats to cease offensive operations and return to bases in Norway.
  - The Holy Crown of Hungary is found in Mattsee, Austria, by the United States Army 86th Infantry Division. The U.S. government keeps the crown in Fort Knox for safekeeping from the Soviets until it is returned to Hungary on January 6, 1978.
  - German auxiliary cruiser Orion is sunk on her way to Copenhagen carrying refugees, with a loss of over 3,800 lives.
  - American troops capture the city of Salzburg.
- May 5 – WWII:
  - Prague uprising: Prague rises up against occupying Nazi forces, encouraged by radio broadcasts (giving rise to the Battle for Czech Radio).
  - The US 11th Armored Division liberates the prisoners of Mauthausen concentration camp, including Simon Wiesenthal.
  - Canadian soldiers liberate the city of Amsterdam from Nazi occupation.
  - A Japanese fire balloon kills six people, Elsie Mitchell and five children, near Bly, Oregon, when it explodes as they drag it from the woods. These are the only people killed by an enemy attack on the American mainland during WWII.
- May 6
  - WWII:
    - Troops of 16th Armored Division (United States) reach the Czech city of Plzeň.
    - Mildred Gillars ("Axis Sally") delivers her last propaganda broadcast to Allied troops (the first was on December 11, 1941).
  - Holocaust: Ebensee concentration camp in Austria is liberated by troops of the 80th Division (United States).
- May 6–7 – The government of the Independent State of Croatia, the Nazi-affiliated fascist puppet state established in occupied Yugoslavia, flees Zagreb for a location near Klagenfurt in Austria, but is captured in the Bleiburg repatriations, leading to mass executions.
- May 7 – WWII:
  - At 02:41, General Alfred Jodl signs the unconditional German Instrument of Surrender in SHAEF HQ at Reims, France, to end Germany's participation in the war. Surrender is effective on May 8 at 23:01 hours Central European Time (00:01 hours May 9 German Summer Time). This afternoon Lutz Graf Schwerin von Krosigk, Leading Minister in the rump Flensburg Government, makes a broadcast announcing the German surrender and American journalist Edward Kennedy breaks an Allied embargo on news of the signing.
  - Numerous RAF Lancasters land in Germany to repatriate British prisoners of war. Some 4,500 ex-POWs are flown back to Great Britain over the next 24 hours.
- May 8 – WWII:
  - Victory in Europe Day (VE Day) is observed by the western European powers as Nazi Germany surrenders, marking the end of WWII in Europe.
  - Shortly before midnight (May 9 Moscow time) the final German Instrument of Surrender is signed at the seat of the Soviet Military Administration in Berlin-Karlshorst, attended by Allied representatives.
  - Canadian troops move into Amsterdam, after German troops surrender.
  - The surrender of the Dodecanese is signed in Symi.
  - The Prague uprising ends with a ceasefire.
  - The Eighth British Army, together with Slovene partisan troops and a motorized detachment of the Yugoslav 4th Army, arrives in Carinthia and Klagenfurt. The Croatian Armed Forces of the Independent State of Croatia are ordered by their commanders not to surrender to the Yugoslav Partisans, but to attempt to retreat to Austria and surrender to the British, part of the events leading to the Bleiburg repatriations.
  - Hermann Göring surrenders himself to the United States Army near Radstadt.
- May 8–29 – Sétif and Guelma massacre: in Algeria, thousands die as French troops and released Italian POWs kill an estimated 6,000 to 40,000 Algerian citizens.
- May 9 – WWII:
  - The Soviet Union marks VE Day as the Red Army enters Prague, celebrated in the USSR as Victory Day.
  - Vidkun Quisling and other members of the collaborationist Quisling regime in Norway surrender to the Resistance (Milorg) and police at Møllergata 19 in Oslo, as part of the legal purge in Norway after World War II.
  - General Alexander Löhr, Commander of German Army Group E near Topolšica, Slovenia, signs the capitulation of German occupation troops.
  - Liberation of the German-occupied Channel Islands: British forces take the surrender of the occupying troops, with Royal Navy ships HMS Bulldog arriving in St Peter Port, Guernsey, and HMS Beagle in St Helier, Jersey.
- May 10 – WWII: Liberation of the German-occupied Channel Islands: Occupation of Sark ends, with British forces taking the surrender of the occupying troops and leaving them under the orders of Dame Sibyl Hathaway.
- May 12
  - Argentinian labour leader José Peter declares the Meat Industry Workers Federation dissolved.
  - Rev. W. V. Awdry's children's book The Three Railway Engines, first of The Railway Series, is published in England.
- May 14–15 – WWII: Battle of Poljana: The last battle of the War in Europe is fought at Poljana near Slovenj Gradec, Slovenia.
- May 15 – WWII: Surrender at Bleiburg – Retreating troops of the Croatian Armed Forces of the former puppet Independent State of Croatia (intermingled with fleeing civilians) attempt to surrender to the British Army at Bleiburg, but are directed to surrender to Yugoslav Partisans, who open fire on them. The remainder, after orders are given by Tito, are force-marched through Croatia and Serbia, interned or massacred, with thousands dying.
- May 16 – WWII: Liberation of the German-occupied Channel Islands: Occupation of Alderney ends, with British forces taking the surrender of the occupying troops, the civilian population having been evacuated.
- May 18 – WWII: Operation Unthinkable – British prime minister Winston Churchill secretly requests his military chiefs of staff to consider a plan for British, American and reactivated German forces to attack the Soviet Red Army on July 1 to preserve the independence of Poland. The operation is ruled militarily unfeasible.
- May 23
  - The Flensburg Government is dissolved by the Allies, and German president Karl Dönitz and German chancellor Lutz Graf Schwerin von Krosigk are arrested by British RAF Regiment personnel at Flensburg. They are respectively the last German head of state and head of government until 1949.
  - Heinrich Himmler, former head of the Nazi SS, commits suicide in British custody.
- May 28 – U.S.-born Irish-raised William Joyce ("Lord Haw-Haw") is captured on the German border. He is later charged in London with high treason for his earlier English-language wartime broadcasts from German radio, convicted, and then hanged in January 1946.
- May 29
  - German communists, led by Walter Ulbricht, arrive in Berlin.
  - Dutch painter Han van Meegeren is arrested for collaboration with the Nazis, but the "Dutch Golden Age" paintings he has sold to Hermann Göring (Koch) are later proved to be his own fakes.
- May 30 – The Iranian government demands that all Soviet and British troops leave the country.

=== June ===
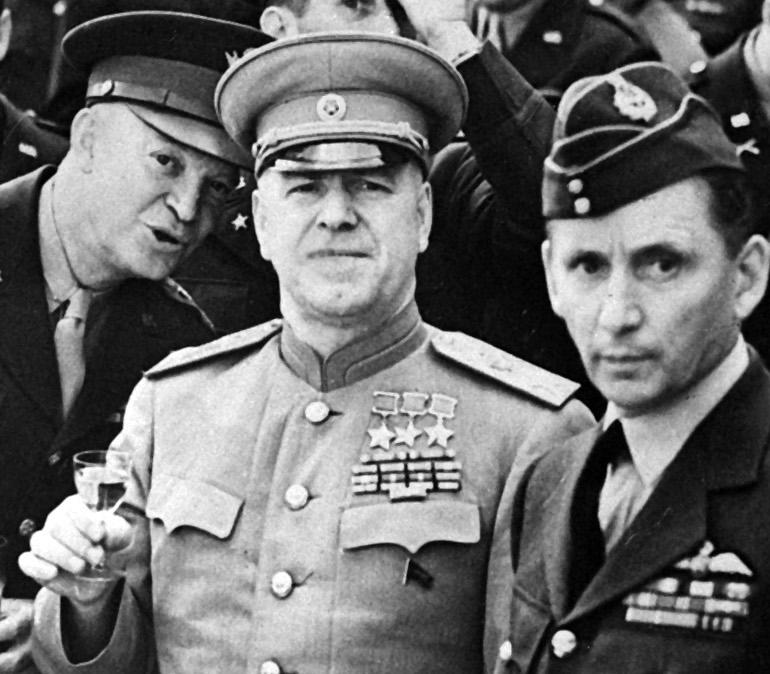
June 5 – Dwight Eisenhower, Georgy Zhukov and Arthur Tedder.

- June 1 – The British take over Lebanon and Syria.
- June 5 – The Allied Control Council, the military occupation governing body of Germany, formally takes power.
- June 7 – King Haakon VII of Norway returns to Norway five years to the day after leaving for exile in Britain.
- June 11
  - William Lyon Mackenzie King is re-elected as Canadian prime minister.
  - The Franck Committee recommends against a surprise nuclear bombing of Japan.
- June 12 – The Yugoslav Army leaves Trieste, leaving the New Zealand Army in control.
- June 21 – WWII: The Battle of Okinawa ends, with U.S. occupation of the island until 1972.
- June 24 – WWII: A victory parade is held in Red Square in Moscow.
- June 25 – Seán T. O'Kelly is elected the second President of Ireland.
- June 26 – The United Nations Charter is signed in San Francisco.
- June 29 – Czechoslovakia cedes Carpathian Ruthenia to the Soviet Union.
- June 30 – John von Neumann's First Draft of a Report on the EDVAC is distributed, containing the first published description of the logical design of a computer, with stored-program and instruction data stored in the same address space within the memory (von Neumann architecture).

=== July ===
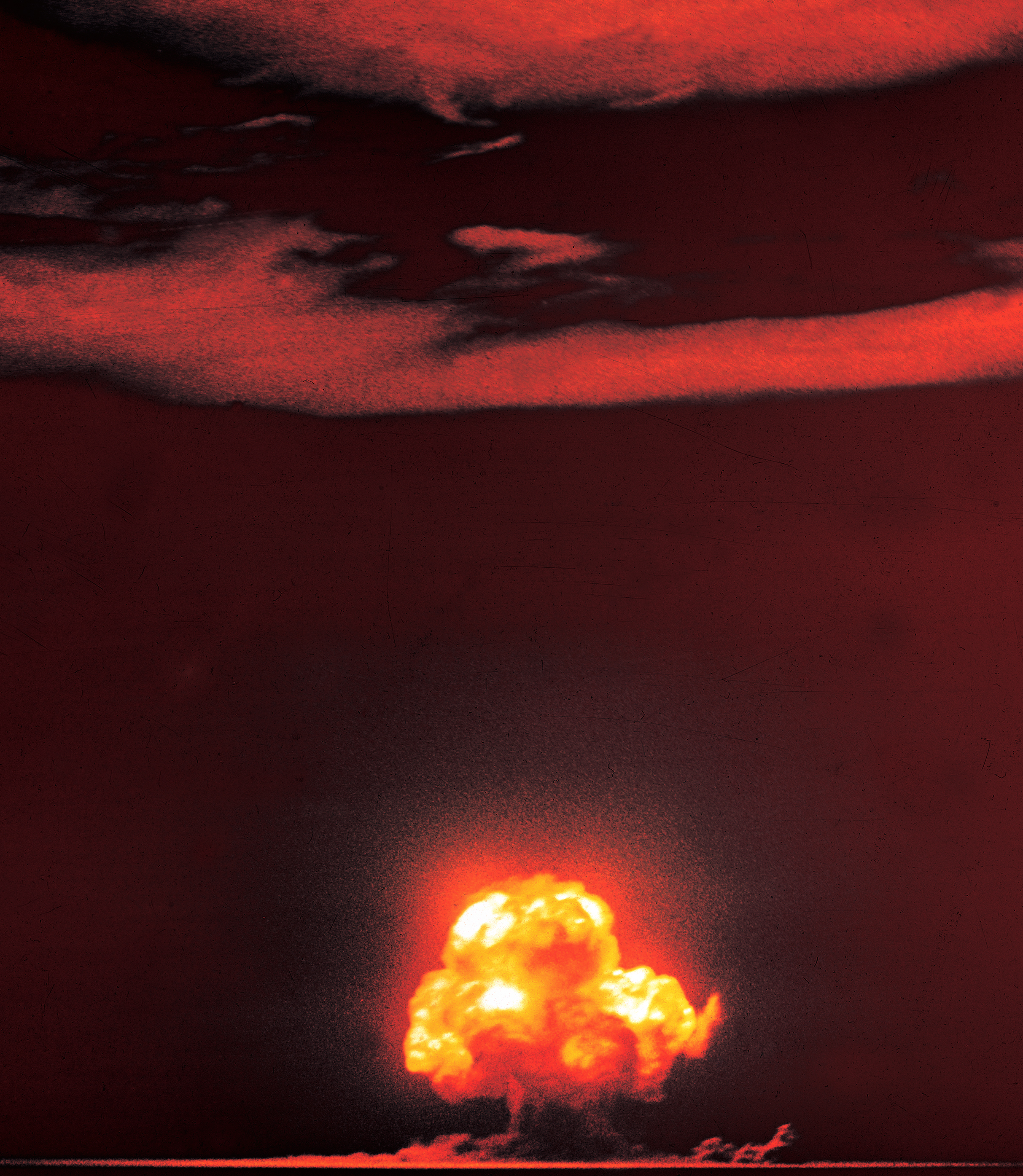
July 16 – Trinity test at night in New Mexico.

- July 1
  - WWII: Germany and its capital Berlin are divided between the Allied occupation forces. German reunification will not take place until 1990.
  - WWII: Australian and other Allied forces launch an invasion of the east coast of Japanese-occupied Borneo near Balikpapan.
- July 2 – The 1945 Sheikh Bashir rebellion breaks out in Burao and Erigavo in British Somaliland, led by Sheikh Bashir, a Somali religious leader.
- July 4 – Brazilian cruiser Bahia is sunk by an accidentally induced explosion, killing more than 300 and stranding the survivors in shark-infested waters.
- July 5
  - The 1945 United Kingdom general election is held, though some constituencies delay their polls for local holiday reasons. Counting of votes and declaration of results are delayed until July 26 to allow for voting by the large number of service personnel still overseas.
  - John Curtin, 14th Prime Minister of Australia, dies in office from heart failure at the age of 60. He is briefly replaced by his deputy Frank Forde, who serves as the 15th Prime Minister until a Labor Party leadership election is held to replace Curtin.
  - WWII: The Philippines are declared liberated.
- July 6–7 – Schio massacre: 54 prisoners, mostly fascist sympathisers, are killed by members of the Italian resistance movement in Schio.
- July 8 – WWII: Harry S. Truman is informed that Japan will talk peace if it can retain the reign of the Emperor.
- July 12 – Ben Chifley is elected leader of the Labor Party, and consequently becomes the 16th Prime Minister of Australia, defeating Frank Forde as well as Norman Makin and H.V. Evatt. As a result, Forde becomes the shortest-serving prime minister in Australian history; nevertheless, he retains his post as deputy leader.
- July 14 – WWII: Italy declares war on Japan.
- July 16
  - The Trinity nuclear test in New Mexico, the first of an atomic bomb, using about six kilograms of plutonium, succeeds in unleashing an explosion equivalent to that of 22 kilotons of TNT.
  - A train collision near Munich, Germany kills 102 war prisoners.
- July 17–August 2 – WWII: Potsdam Conference – At Potsdam, the three main Allied leaders hold their final summit of the war. President Truman officially informs Stalin that the U.S. has a powerful new weapon.
- July 21 – WWII: President Harry S. Truman approves the order for atomic bombs to be used against Japan.
- July 23 – WWII: French marshal Philippe Pétain, who headed the Vichy government during WWII, goes on trial for treason.
- July 26
  - Winston Churchill resigns as Prime Minister of the United Kingdom, after his Conservative Party is soundly defeated by the Labour Party in the 1945 general election. Clement Attlee becomes the new prime minister. It is the first time that Labour has governed Britain with a majority in the House of Commons.
  - The Potsdam Declaration demands Japan's unconditional surrender; Article 12, permitting Japan to retain the reign of the Emperor, has been deleted by President Truman.
- July 27 – WWII: Bombing of Aomori – Two USAAF B-29s drop a total of 60,000 leaflets on the Japanese city of Aomori, warning civilians of an air raid and urging them to leave immediately.
- July 28
  - WWII:
    - Bombing of Aomori – The Japanese city of Aomori is firebombed by 63 USAAF B-29 heavy bombers, killing 1,767 civilians and destroying 18,045 homes.
    - Japan ambiguously rejects the Potsdam Declaration.
  - 1945 Empire State Building B-25 crash: A North American B-25 Mitchell crashes into the Empire State Building in New York City, killing 14 people.
- July 29 – The BBC Light Programme radio station is launched in the United Kingdom, aimed at mainstream light entertainment and music.
- July 30 – WWII: Heavy cruiser USS Indianapolis is hit and sunk by torpedoes from the Japanese submarine I-58 in the Philippine Sea. Some 900 survivors jump into the sea and are adrift for up to four days. Nearly 600 die before help arrives. Captain Charles B. McVay III of the cruiser is later court-martialed and convicted; in 2000, he is posthumously exonerated.

=== August ===
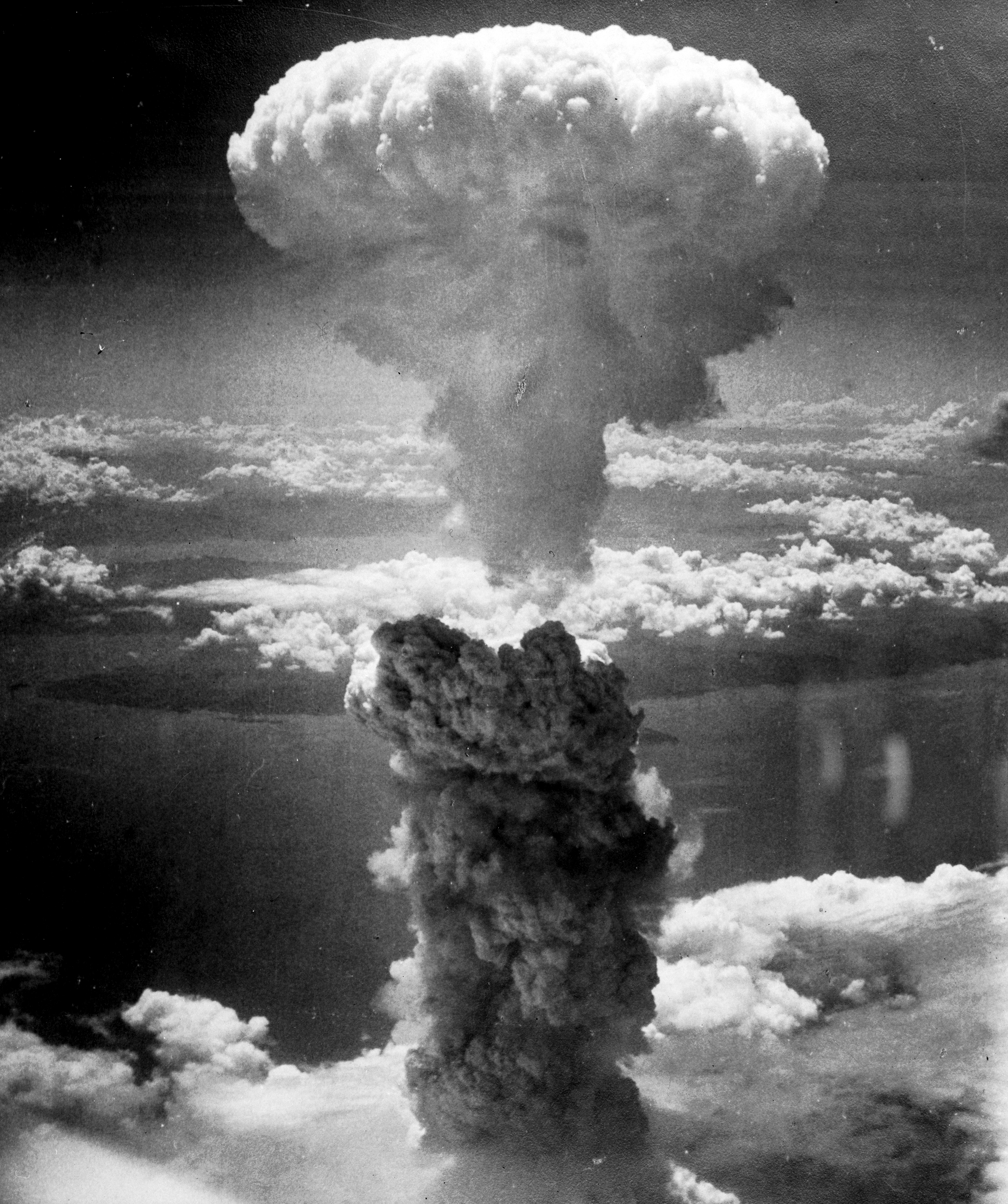
August 9 – The mushroom cloud from the nuclear bomb dropped on Nagasaki rising 18 km into the air.

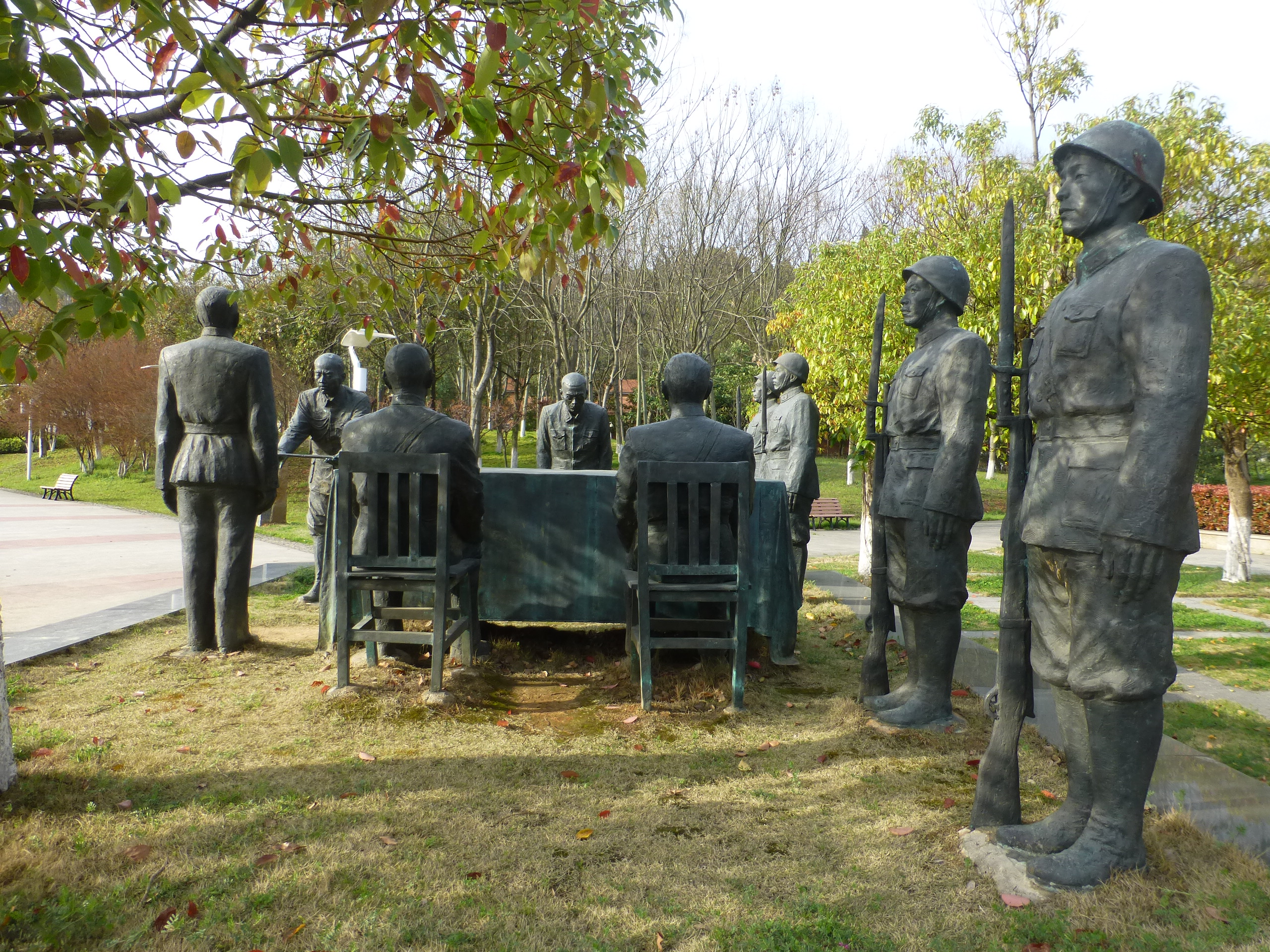
August 18 – Surrender of the Japanese Army in Central China (Memorial in Wuhan).

- August 6 – WWII: Atomic bombing of Hiroshima – United States Boeing B-29 Superfortress Enola Gay drops a uranium-235 atomic bomb, codenamed "Little Boy", on the Japanese city of Hiroshima at 8:15 a.m. local time, resulting in between 90,000 and 146,000 deaths.
- August 7 – U.S. President Harry Truman announces the successful atomic bombing of Hiroshima, while he is returning from the Potsdam Conference aboard the U.S. Navy heavy cruiser USS Augusta (CA-31), in the middle of the Atlantic Ocean.
- August 8
  - The United Nations Charter is ratified by the United States Senate.
  - WWII: The Soviet Union declares war on Japan.
- August 9 – WWII:
  - Atomic bombing of Nagasaki: United States B-29 Bockscar drops a plutonium-239 atomic bomb, codenamed "Fat Man", on the Japanese city of Nagasaki at 11:02 a.m. local time, resulting in between 39,000 and 80,000 deaths.
  - The Soviet–Japanese War opens: The Soviet Union begins its army offensive against Japan, in the northern part of the Japanese-held puppet region of Manchuria, including the 25th Army (Soviet Union)'s advance into the northern peninsula of Korea.
- August 10 – WWII: Japan offers to surrender to the Allies, "provided this does not prejudice the sovereignty of the Emperor".
- August 11
  - WWII: The Allies reply to the Japanese surrender offer by stating that Emperor Hirohito will be subject to the authority of the Supreme Commander of the Allied Forces.
  - The Holocaust: Kraków pogrom – Róża Berger is shot dead by Polish militia.
- August 11–25 – Soviet troops complete the occupation of Sakhalin.
- August 13 – The Zionist World Congress approaches the British government to discuss the founding of the country of Israel.
- August 14 – WWII: Emperor Hirohito accepts the terms of the Potsdam Declaration. His recorded announcement of this is smuggled out of the Tokyo Imperial Palace. At 19:00 hrs in Washington, D.C. (23:00 GMT), U.S. president Harry S. Truman announces the Japanese surrender.
- August 15
  - WWII:
    - Bombing of Kumagaya, Japan, by the United States using conventional bombs, beginning at 00:23.
    - Hirohito surrender broadcast (Gyokuon-hōsō): Emperor Hirohito's announcement of the unconditional surrender of Japan is broadcast on the radio a little after noon (12:00 Japan Standard Time is 03:00 GMT). This is probably the first time an Emperor of Japan has been heard by the common people. Delivered in formal classical Japanese, without directly referring to surrender and following official censorship of the country's weak position, the recorded speech is not immediately easily understood by ordinary people. The Allies call this day Victory over Japan Day (V-J Day). This ends the period of Japanese expansionism, and begins the period of the Occupation of Japan and sets the stage for Korean independence.
  - The August Revolution in Vietnam begins, with the Viet Minh taking over the capital Hanoi, taking advantage of the collapse of Japanese power.
  - The Provisional International Civil Aviation Organization is founded as a specialized agency of the United Nations.
- August 17
  - Philippines President José P. Laurel issues an Executive Proclamation putting an end to the Second Philippine Republic, thus ending his term as President of the Philippines.
  - Proclamation of Indonesian Independence: Indonesian nationalists Sukarno and Mohammad Hatta declare the independence of the Republic of Indonesia, with Sukarno as president and Mohammad Hatta as vice-president, igniting the Indonesian National Revolution against the Dutch Empire.
- August 18 – WWII: Death of Subhas Chandra Bose – Indian nationalist leader Subhas Chandra Bose is killed as a result of his overloaded Japanese plane crashing in Japanese Taiwan.
- August 19 – Chinese Civil War: Mao Zedong and Chiang Kai-shek meet in Chongqing to discuss an end to hostilities between the Communists and the Nationalists.
- August 23 – Soviet–Japanese War: Joseph Stalin orders the detention of Japanese prisoners of war in the Soviet Union.
- August 25
  - Bảo Đại abdicates as Emperor of Vietnam, ending 2,000 years of dynastic and monarchic rule in the country and 143 years of the Nguyễn dynasty.
  - Paris marks the first anniversary of its liberation.
- August 28 – The American-led Allied Occupation of Japan effectively begins with General Douglas MacArthur's arrival at Atsugi Air Base.
- August 30 – WWII:
  - Vietnam's capital Hanoi is taken by the Viet Minh, which ends the French occupation in what becomes North Vietnam, and thus the southern provinces become South Vietnam. This ends the August Revolution.
  - Liberation of Hong Kong from Japanese control, when the British Royal Navy returns Hong Kong to its interrupted British colonial status (1841–1997).
- August 31
  - WWII: Allied troops arrest German field marshal Walther von Brauchitsch.
  - A team at American Cyanamid's Lederle Laboratories, Pearl River, New York, led by Yellapragada Subbarow, announces they have obtained folic acid in a pure crystalline form. This vitamin is abundant in green leaf vegetables, liver, kidney, and yeast.

=== September ===
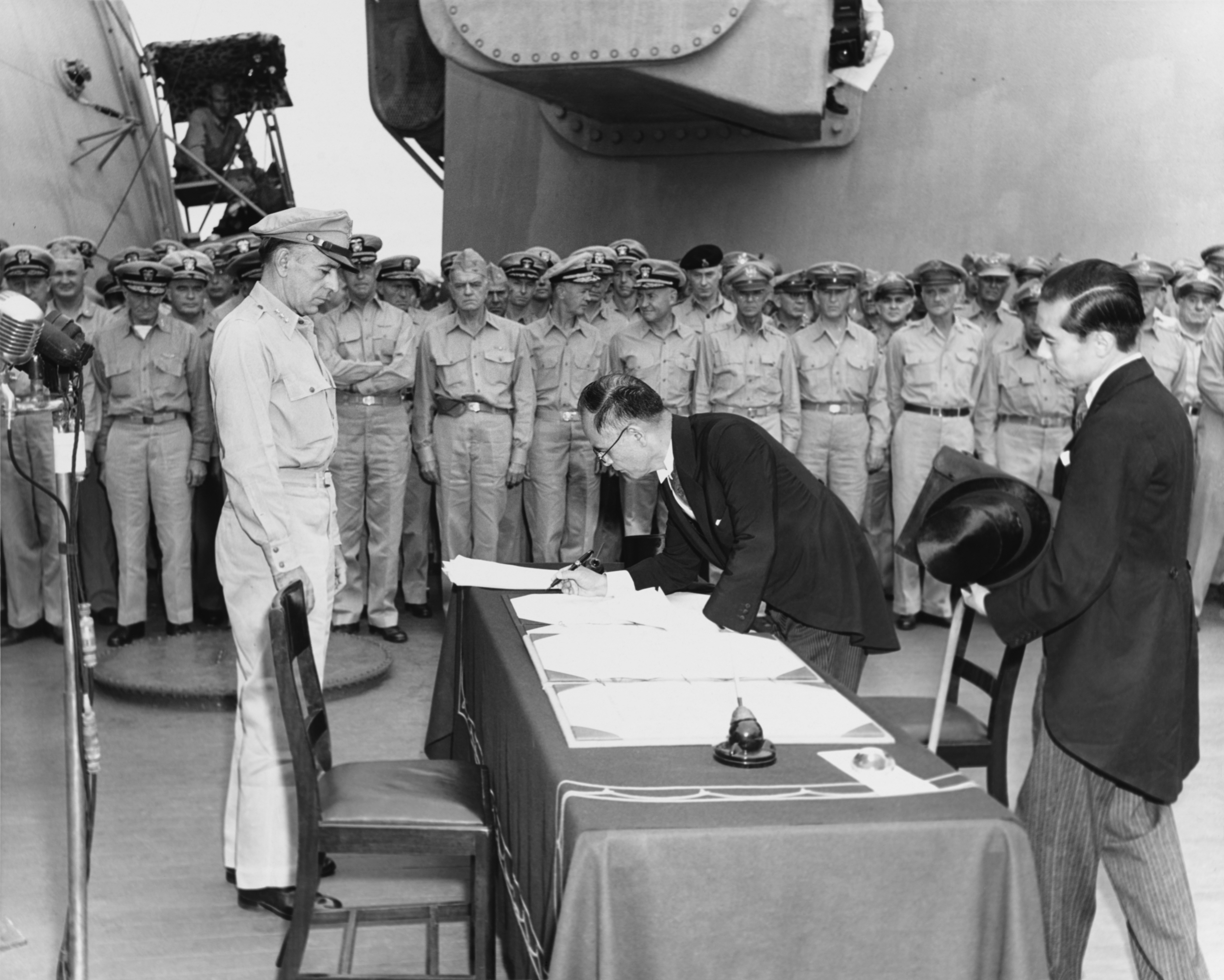
September 2 – Japan signs the Instrument of Surrender aboard the USS Missouri.

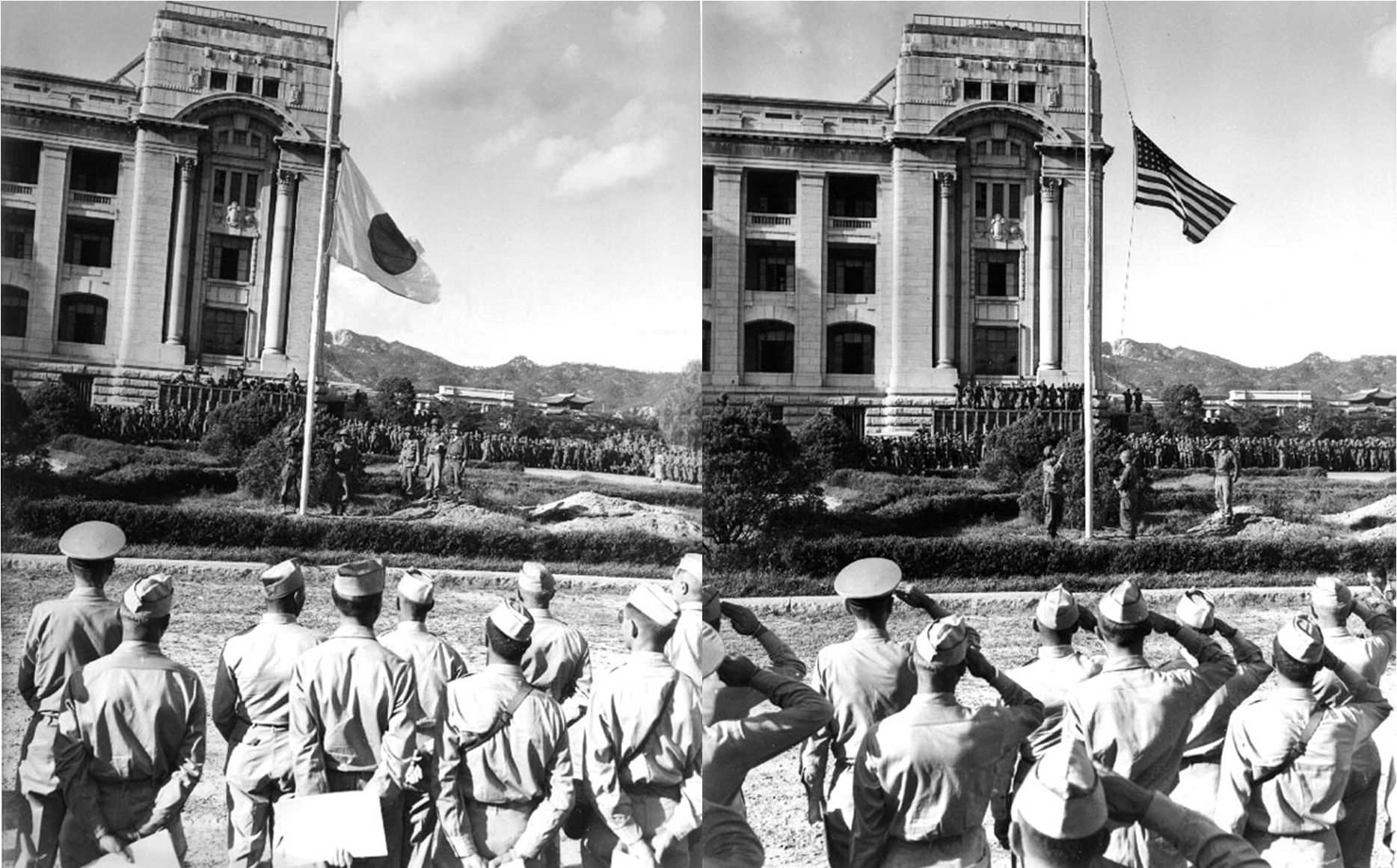
September 9 – Japanese troops formally relinquish control of Southern Korea over to the United States, effectively ending Japan's 35-year rule over Korea.

- September 2 – World War II ends:
  - Japanese general Tomoyuki Yamashita surrenders to Philippine and American forces at Kiangan, Ifugao.
  - The final official Japanese Instrument of Surrender is accepted by the Supreme Allied Commander, General Douglas MacArthur, and Fleet Admiral Chester W. Nimitz for the United States, and delegates from the United Kingdom, Australia, New Zealand, the Netherlands, China, and others from a Japanese delegation led by Mamoru Shigemitsu, on board the American battleship USS Missouri in Tokyo Bay.
  - General Douglas MacArthur is given the title of Supreme Commander Allied Powers, and is also tasked with the occupation of Japan.
  - The Democratic Republic of Vietnam is officially established, by Ho Chi Minh.
- September 4 – WWII: Japanese forces surrender on Wake Island, after hearing word of their country's surrender.
- September 5
  - Iva Toguri D'Aquino, a Japanese American suspected of being wartime radio propagandist "Tokyo Rose", is arrested in Yokohama.
  - Russian code clerk Igor Gouzenko comes forward with numerous documents implicating the Soviet Union in many spy rings in North America, both in the United States and in Canada.
- September 8
  - U.S. troops arrive in Southern Korea.
  - The Afghan government defeats a rebel force at the siege of Kunar Khas; Gerald Crichton, the British Charge de 'affairs in Kabul, later describes the victory as the "turning point" of the Afghan tribal revolts of 1944–1947.
- September 9
  - Chairman of the Nationalist Government of China Chiang Kai-shek officially accepts the Japanese capitulation at Nanking.
  - Japanese troops in Keijō (modern-day Seoul) formally relinquish control over Southern Korea to the United States Army Military Government in Korea, while Soviet forces control Northern Korea from Heijō (modern-day Pyongyang), effectively ending 35 years of Korea under Japanese rule and beginning the Division of Korea at the 38th parallel.
- September 10 – Vidkun Quisling is sentenced to death for being a Nazi collaborator in Norway.
- September 11
  - Hideki Tojo, Japanese prime minister during most of World War II, attempts to commit suicide to avoid facing an Allied war crimes tribunal.
  - Radio Republik Indonesia starts broadcasting.
  - The Batu Lintang camp in Sarawak, Borneo is liberated by Australian forces.
- September 12
  - Operation Tiderace: The Japanese Army formally surrenders to the British in Singapore.
  - The office of governor-general of Korea is disbanded by the United States Army Military Government in Korea, formally ending Japan's 35-year rule in Korea.
- September 15–16 – 1945 Homestead hurricane: The ninth tropical storm of the season makes landfall in Florida, the first intense storm to do so in the state since 1935. It affects Key Largo and Dade County, killing 4 people in Florida and 22 others in the Bahamas and in the Turks and Caicos Islands.
- September 18
  - Typhoon Makurazaki kills 3,746 people in Japan.
  - The Japanese Army in Central China officially surrenders to the Chinese, in Wuhan.
- September 19 – Former Korean guerilla fighter Kim Il Sung (father of Kim Jong Il and grandfather of Kim Jong Un), at this time a Red Army captain, returns to now-Soviet-occupied Korea.
- September 20 – Mohandas Gandhi and Jawaharlal Nehru demand that all British troops depart India.
- September 24 – Postwar anti-Jewish violence in Slovakia: The Topoľčany pogrom is carried out in Czechoslovakia.

=== October ===
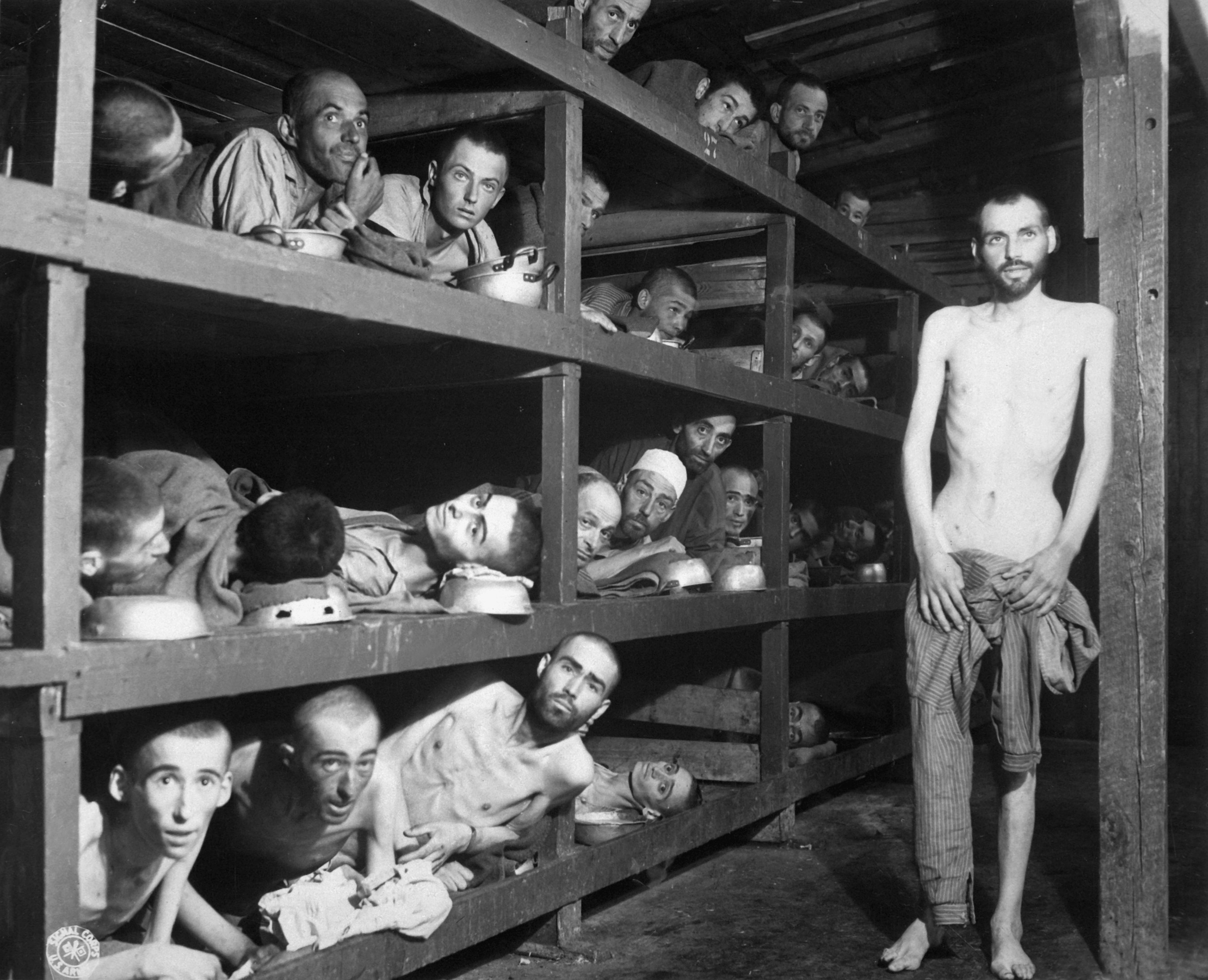
October 18 – Nuremberg trials begin, after Buchenwald closes.

- October – Arthur C. Clarke puts forward the idea of a geosynchronous communications satellite, in a Wireless World magazine article.
- October 1–15 – Operation Backfire: Three captured V-2 rockets are launched under British control near Cuxhaven, as part of an Allied evaluation of the technology.
- October 2 – George Albert Smith becomes president of the Church of Jesus Christ of Latter-day Saints.
- October 4 – The JSD Partizan sports club is founded in Belgrade, Serbia.
- October 5 – Hollywood Black Friday: A strike by the Set Decorator's Union in Hollywood results in a riot.
- October 8–15 – Hadamar Trial: Personnel of the Hadamar killing centre, now in the American zone of Allied-occupied Germany, are the first to be tried for systematic extermination in Nazi Germany.
- October 9 – Former prime minister Pierre Laval is sentenced to death, for collaboration with the Nazis in Vichy France.
- October 10 – The Nazi Party is dissolved by the Allied Powers.
- October 14
  - In Czechoslovakia, a new provisional national assembly is elected.
  - Kim Il Sung makes his first major public appearance in Pyongyang in northern Korea at the celebration of liberation where he is officially introduced to the public by the Soviet Civil Administration authorities as a national hero, a legendary guerrilla fighter and leader.
- October 15–21 – The Fifth Pan-African Congress is held in Manchester.
- October 16
  - The Food and Agriculture Organization is established at a meeting in Quebec City as a specialized agency of the United Nations.
  - Syngman Rhee returns to the southern peninsula of Korea, arriving in Seoul as a prominent figure under the United States Army Military Government in Korea.
- October 17 – A massive number of people, headed for the General Confederation of Labour (Argentina), gather in the Plaza de Mayo in Buenos Aires to demand Juan Perón's release. This is known to the Peronists as the Día de la lealtad (Loyalty Day) and considered the founding day of Peronism.
- October 18 – Isaías Medina Angarita, president of Venezuela, is overthrown by a military coup.
- October 19 – Members of the Indonesian People's Army attack Anglo-Dutch forces in Indonesia.
- October 20 – Mongolians vote for independence from China.
- October 21 – Women's suffrage: Women are allowed to vote in the French Legislative Election for the first time.
- October 22 – Rómulo Betancourt is named provisional president of Venezuela.
- October 24
  - The United Nations is founded by ratification of its Charter, by 29 nations including the United Kingdom, the United States, France, Canada, Egypt, Brazil, Haiti, Luxembourg, the Soviet Union, Czechoslovakia and others.
  - The International Court of Justice ("World Court") is established by the United Nations Charter.
  - Norwegian Nazi leader Vidkun Quisling is executed by firing squad, for treason against Norway.
- October 25
  - WWII: Japanese armed forces in Taiwan surrender to the Allies.
  - Getúlio Vargas is deposed as president in Brazil; José Linhares is named temporary president.
  - Osijek prison massacre by Yugoslav secret police.
- October 27–November 20 – Indonesian National Revolution: Battle of Surabaya – Pro-independence Indonesian soldiers and militia fight British and British Indian troops in Surabaya.
- October 29
  - Getúlio Vargas resigns as president of Brazil.
  - At Gimbels Department Store in New York City, the first ballpoint pens go on sale at $12.50 each.
- October 30 – The undivided country of India joins the United Nations.

=== November ===
- November 1
  - International Labour Organization's new constitution comes into effect.
  - Australia joins the United Nations.
  - Telechron introduces the model 8H59 Musalarm, the first clock radio.
- November 4 – The 1945 Hungarian parliamentary election gives a large majority to the Independent Smallholders Party; however, its power is not sustained.
- November 5 – Colombia joins the United Nations.
- November 6 – Indonesians reject an offer of autonomy from the Dutch.
- November 7 – South Africa and Mexico both join the United Nations.
- November 9 – Soo Bahk Do and Moo Duk Kwan martial arts are founded in Korea.
- November 10 – Indonesian National Revolution: Battle of Surabaya – Following the killing of British officer Brigadier A. W. S. Mallaby on October 30, the British Indian Army (in support of its allied Dutch colonial administration) begins an advance on Surabaya in the Dutch East Indies against Indonesian nationalists; although most of the city is retaken in 3 days of heavy fighting, the strength of the resistance leads to today being celebrated as Heroes' Day (Hari Pahlawan) in Indonesia.
- November 11 – 1945 Yugoslavian parliamentary election: Marshal Josip Broz Tito and the People's Front win a decisive majority (90%) in the Yugoslavian Assembly.
- November 15
  - Harry S. Truman, Clement Attlee and Mackenzie King share nuclear information with the U.N. and call for a United Nations Atomic Energy Commission.
  - An offensive is begun in Manchuria by the Kuomintang (Chinese Nationalists) against further infiltration by the Chinese Communist Party.
- November 16
  - Charles de Gaulle is unanimously elected president of France by the provisional government.
  - The United States controversially imports 88 German scientists to help in the production of rocket technology.
  - The foundation of UNESCO (United Nations Educational, Scientific and Cultural Organization) is agreed at a meeting in London.
- November 18 – The Tudeh party starts a bloodless coup, and will form Azerbaijan within days. Soviet troops prevent Iranian troops from getting involved.
- November 20 – The Nuremberg trials begin: Trials against 22 Nazis for war crimes of World War II start at the Palace of Justice, Nuremberg.
- November 26 – U.S. ambassador to China Patrick J. Hurley resigns after he is unable to broker a deal between Chiang Kai-shek and Mao Tse-tung.
- November 28
  - The 1945 Balochistan earthquake causes a tsunami and kills 4,000.
  - British fascist John Amery pleads guilty to treason, and is condemned to death.
- November 29
  - The Socialist Federal Republic of Yugoslavia is declared (this day is celebrated as Republic Day until the 1990s). Marshal Tito is named president.
  - Assembly of the world's first general purpose electronic computer, the Electronic Numerical Integrator Analyzer and Computer (ENIAC), is completed in the United States, covering 1,800 square feet (170 m^{2}) of floor space, and the first set of calculations is run on it.

=== December ===
- December 1 – German general Anton Dostler is executed by firing squad in Italy for the war crime of ordering the summary execution of captured U.S. commandos. The U.S. military tribunal which has tried him has not accepted his plea of "superior orders", setting a precedent for future Allied war crimes trials.
- December 2
  - General Eurico Gaspar Dutra is elected president of Brazil.
  - French banks (Bank of France, BNCI, CNEP, Crédit Lyonnais and Société Générale) are nationalized.
- December 3 – Communist demonstrations in Athens presage the Greek Civil War.
- December 4 – The United States Senate approves the entry of the United States into the United Nations by a vote of 65–7.
- December 5 – Flight 19 of United States Navy Grumman TBF Avenger torpedo bombers disappears on a training exercise from Naval Air Station Fort Lauderdale.
- December 9 – American General George S. Patton is involved in a car accident in Germany, resulting in his death on December 21.
- December 21 – Iraq joins the United Nations.
- December 27 – Twenty-one nations ratify the articles creating the World Bank.
- December 29 – Expulsion of Germans from Hungary is ordered by the Soviet-dominated Hungarian government.

=== Date unknown ===
- A team at Oak Ridge National Laboratory (led by Charles D. Coryell) discovers chemical element 61, the only one still missing between 1 and 96 on the periodic table, which they will name promethium. Found by analysis of fission products of irradiated uranium fuel, its discovery is not made public until 1947.
- The Australian government introduces an Assisted Passage Migration Scheme to encourage the immigration of British subjects, at a fare of £10, hence they become known as "Ten Pound Poms".
- The first geothermal milk pasteurization is done in Klamath Falls, Oregon, United States.

== Births ==
=== January ===
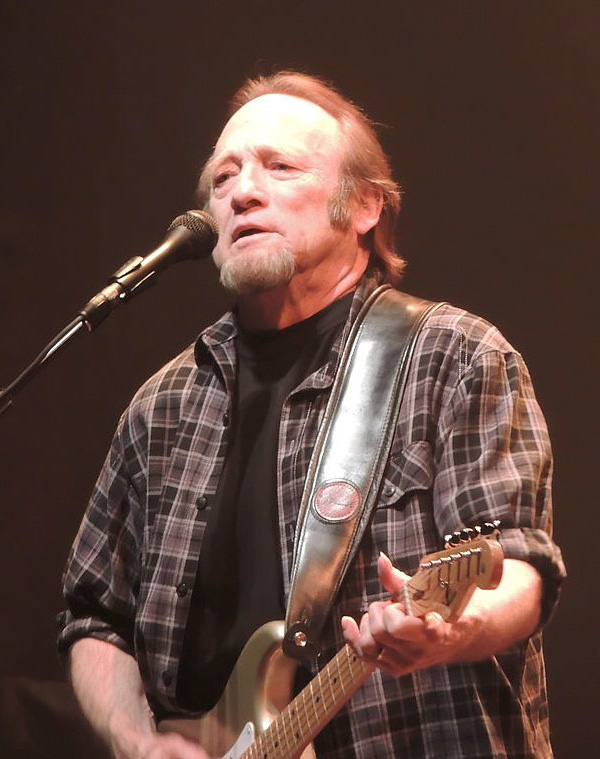
Stephen Stills

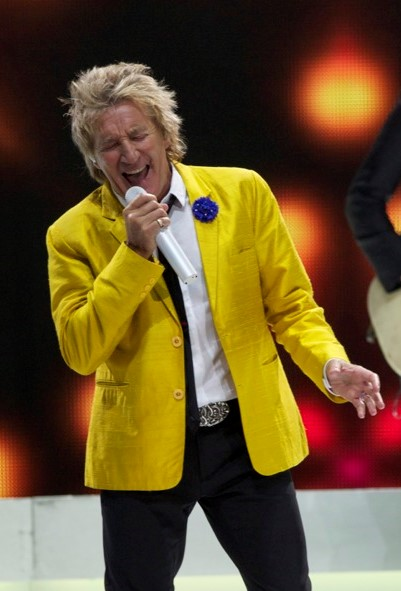
Sir Rod Stewart

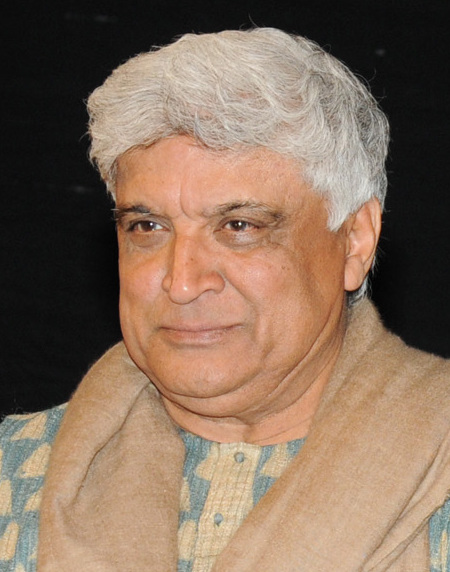
Javed Akhtar

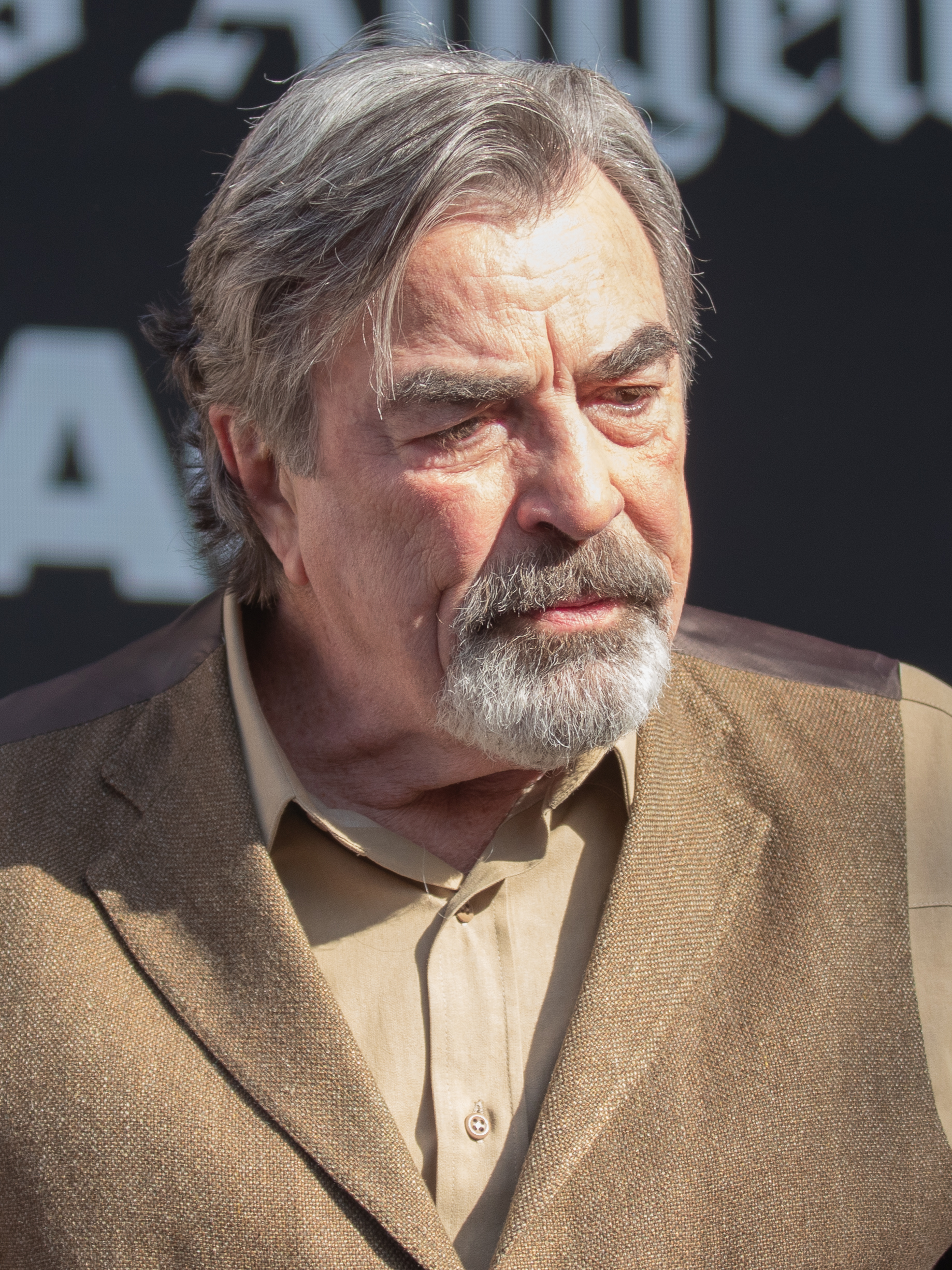
Tom Selleck

- January 1
  - Pietro Grasso, Italian politician
  - Jacky Ickx, Belgian racing driver
- January 3 – Stephen Stills, American rock singer-songwriter (Crosby, Stills, Nash & Young)
- January 4
  - Sima Bina, Iranian vocalist
  - Richard R. Schrock, American chemist, Nobel Prize laureate
- January 5
  - Júlio Isidro, Portuguese television presenter
  - Robert Pindyck, American economist
- January 7
  - Shulamith Firestone, Canadian American feminist, writer (d. 2012)
  - Raila Odinga, prime minister of Kenya (d. 2025)
- January 10 – Sir Rod Stewart, British rock singer
- January 12 – André Bicaba, Burkinabé sprinter
- January 14 – Einar Hákonarson, Icelandic painter
- January 15
  - Vince Foster, American deputy White House counsel during the first term of President Bill Clinton (d. 1993)
  - Princess Michael of Kent, German-born member of the British Royal Family
- January 17 – Javed Akhtar, Indian political activist, poet, lyricist and screenwriter
- January 20 – Robert Olen Butler, American writer
- January 21
  - Arthur Beetson, Australian rugby league player and coach (d. 2011)
  - Martin Shaw, British actor
- January 24 – Subhash Ghai, Indian film director, producer and screenwriter
- January 25 – Leigh Taylor-Young, American actress
- January 26
  - Jacqueline du Pré, English cellist (d. 1987)
  - Graham Williams, New Zealand rugby union player (d. 2018)
- January 27 – Harold Cardinal, Cree political leader, writer and lawyer (d. 2005)
- January 28
  - Karen Lynn Gorney, American actress (Saturday Night Fever)
  - Chuck Pyle, American country-folk singer-songwriter (d. 2015)
- January 29
  - Jim Nicholson, Northern Irish politician
  - Tom Selleck, American actor (Magnum, P.I.)
- January 31 – Joseph Kosuth, American artist

=== February ===
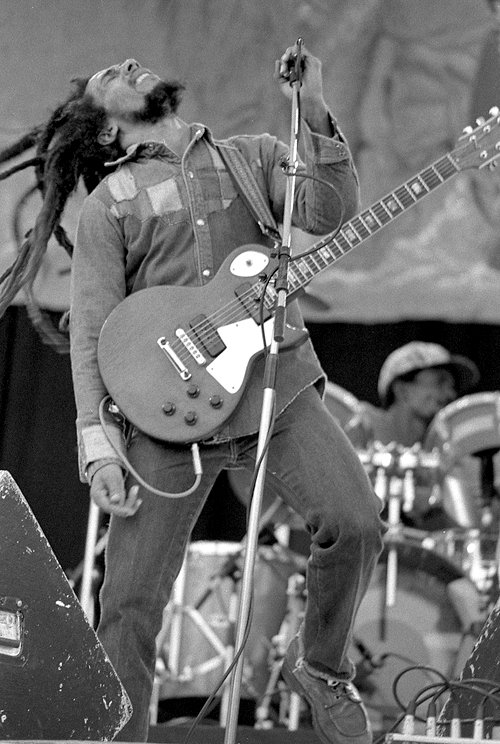
Bob Marley

- February 1 – Yasuhiro Takai, Japanese professional baseball player (d. 2019)
- February 3
  - Bob Griese, American football player
  - Philip Waruinge, Kenyan boxer
- February 4 – John P. Jumper, United States Air Force general
- February 5 – Sarah Weddington, American attorney (d. 2021)
- February 6 – Bob Marley, Jamaican reggae singer-songwriter and musician (d. 1981)
- February 7 – Gerald Davies, Welsh rugby player
- February 9
  - Mia Farrow, American actress
  - Yoshinori Ohsumi, Japanese cell biologist
- February 10 – Koo Bon-moo, South Korean business executive (d. 2018)
- February 12
  - Luiz Carlos Alborghetti, Italian-Brazilian radio commenter, showman and political figure (d. 2009)
  - Maud Adams, Swedish actress
  - David D. Friedman, American economist
- February 13 – Simon Schama, English historian
- February 14
  - Adiss Harmandian, Lebanese-Armenian pop singer (d. 2019)
  - Hans-Adam II, Prince of Liechtenstein
- February 15 – Douglas Hofstadter, American cognitive scientist
- February 17 – Brenda Fricker, Irish actress (d. 2026)
- February 18 – Hashem Mahameed, Israeli politician (d. 2018)
- February 22 – Oliver, American singer (Good Morning Starshine) (d. 2000)
- February 24 – Barry Bostwick, American actor
- February 25 – Roy Saari, American swimmer (d. 2008)
- February 26 – Marta Kristen, Norwegian actress (Lost In Space)
- February 27 – Carl Anderson, American singer, actor (Jesus Christ Superstar) (d. 2004)
- February 28
  - Alexey Ekimov, Russian-born chemist, Nobel Prize laureate
  - Bubba Smith, American football player and actor (d. 2011)

=== March ===
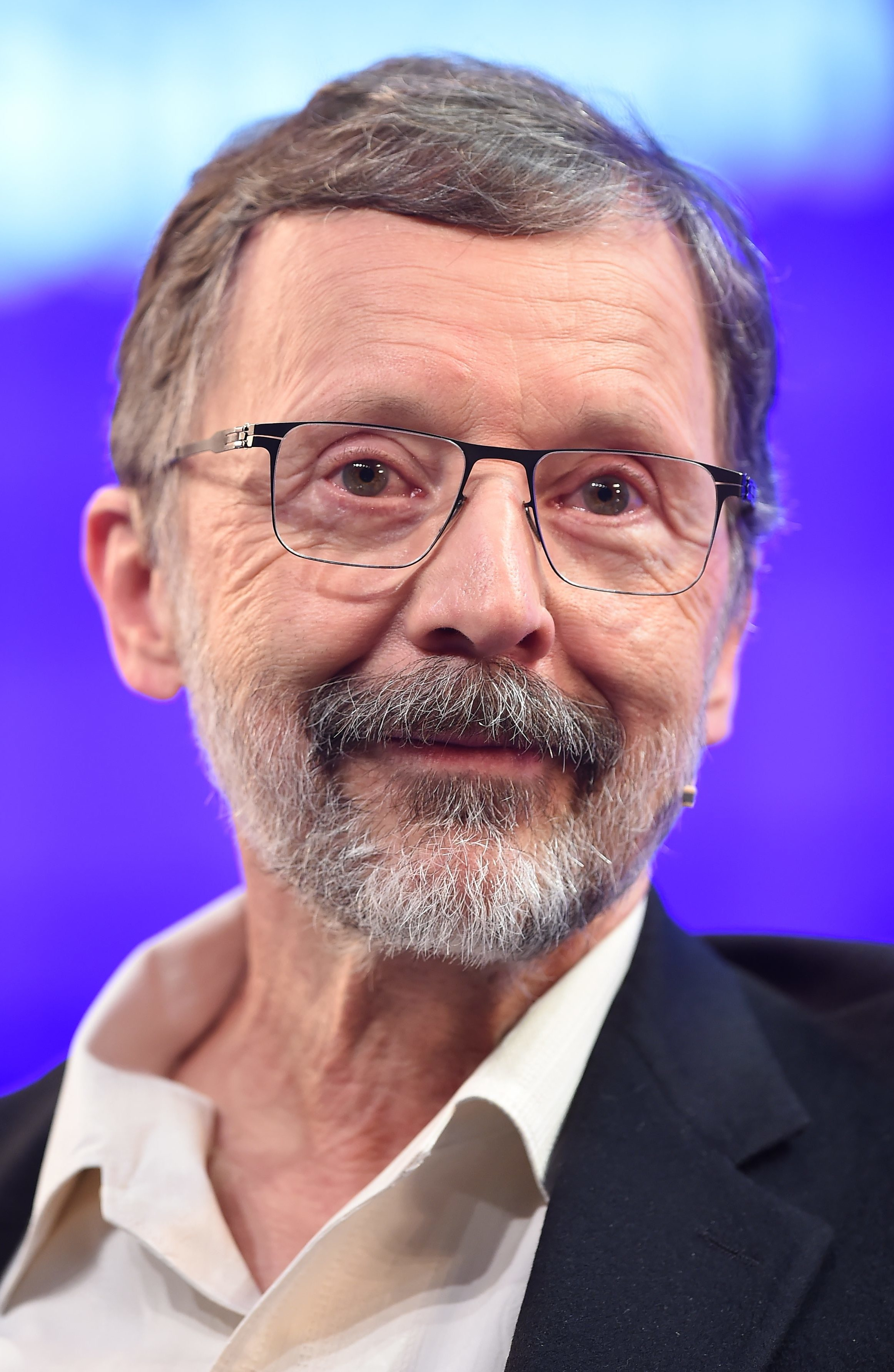
Edwin Catmull

- March 1 – Dirk Benedict, American actor
- March 3 – George Miller, Australian film director
- March 4
  - Dieter Meier, Swiss singer, writer
  - Tommy Svensson, Swedish football manager, player
- March 7 – Arthur Lee, American musician (d. 2006)
- March 8
  - Micky Dolenz, American actor, director and rock musician (The Monkees)
  - Anselm Kiefer, German painter
- March 9
  - Katja Ebstein, German singer
  - Dennis Rader, American serial killer
- March 10 – Nobuhiko Higashikuni, Japanese Imperial prince (d. 2019)
- March 13
  - Othman Abdullah, Malaysian footballer (d. 2015)
  - Anatoly Fomenko, Russian mathematician
- March 14 – Michael Martin Murphey, American country singer-songwriter
- March 16 – Douglas Ahlstedt, American tenor
- March 17
  - Hassan Bechara, Lebanese wrestler (d. 2017)
- March 18
  - Michael Reagan, American television personality, political commentator and Republican strategist (d. 2026)
  - Marta Suplicy, Brazilian politician and psychologist
- March 20
  - Jay Ingram, Canadian television host, author and journalist
  - Bobby Jameson, American singer-songwriter (d. 2015)
  - Pat Riley, American basketball coach
- March 21 – Charles Greene, American Olympic athlete (d. 2022)
- March 26 – Mikhail Voronin, Russian gymnast (d. 2004)
- March 27
  - Enayatollah Bakhshi, Iranian actor (d. 2026)
  - Władysław Stachurski, Polish football player, manager (d. 2013)
- March 28
  - Rodrigo Duterte, 16th President of the Philippines
  - Raine Loo, Estonian actress
- March 29
  - Walt Frazier, African-American basketball player
  - Willem Ruis, Dutch game show host (d. 1986)
- March 30 – Eric Clapton, English rock guitarist and singer-songwriter
- March 31
  - Nana Ampadu, Ghanaian musician (d. 2021)
  - Edwin Catmull, American computer scientist, President of Walt Disney Animation Studios
  - Geneviève Jourdain, French engineer, professor, researcher in the development of signal processing (d. 2006)

=== April ===
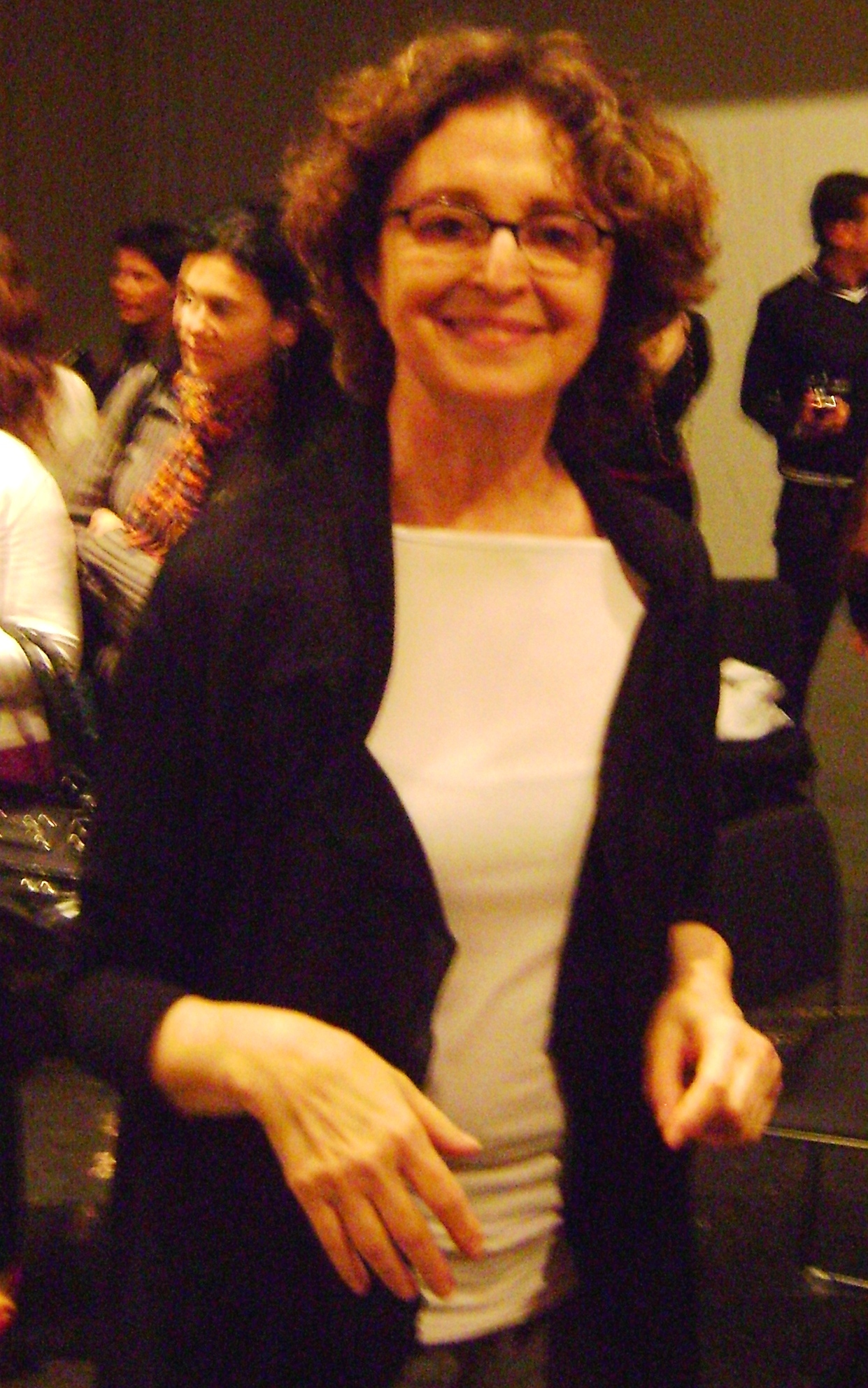
Ana Lúcia Torre

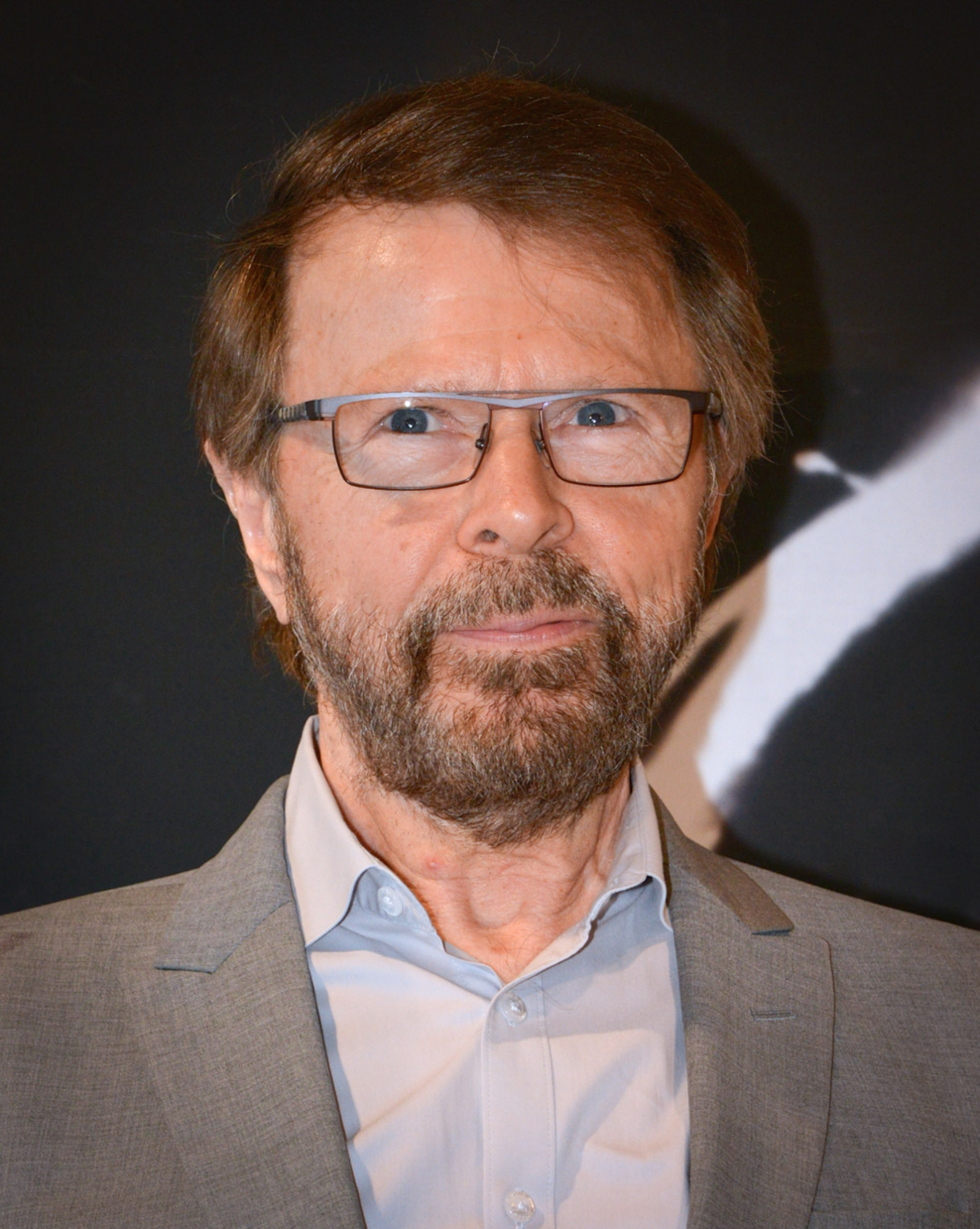
Björn Ulvaeus

- April 2 – Linda Hunt, American actress
- April 4 – Daniel Cohn-Bendit, French political activist
- April 5
  - Cem Karaca, Turkish musician (d. 2004)
  - Tommy Smith, English footballer (d. 2019)
- April 12 – Lee Jong-wook, South Korean Director-General of the World Health Organization (d. 2006)
- April 13
  - Lucha Corpi, Mexican poet
  - Tony Dow, American actor, producer and director (d. 2022)
  - Lowell George, American rock musician (Little Feat) (d. 1979)
- April 14
  - Ritchie Blackmore, English rock guitarist
  - Tuilaʻepa Saʻilele Malielegaoi, 6th Prime Minister of Samoa
- April 20 – Naftali Temu, Kenyan Olympic long-distance runner (d. 2003)
- April 21 – Ana Lúcia Torre, Brazilian actress
- April 24 – Larry Tesler, American computer scientist (cut, copy, paste) (d. 2020)
- April 25 – Björn Ulvaeus, Swedish rock songwriter (ABBA)
- April 29 – Tammi Terrell, African-American soul singer (d. 1970)
- April 30 – Lara Saint Paul, Eritrean-born Italian singer (d. 2018)

=== May ===
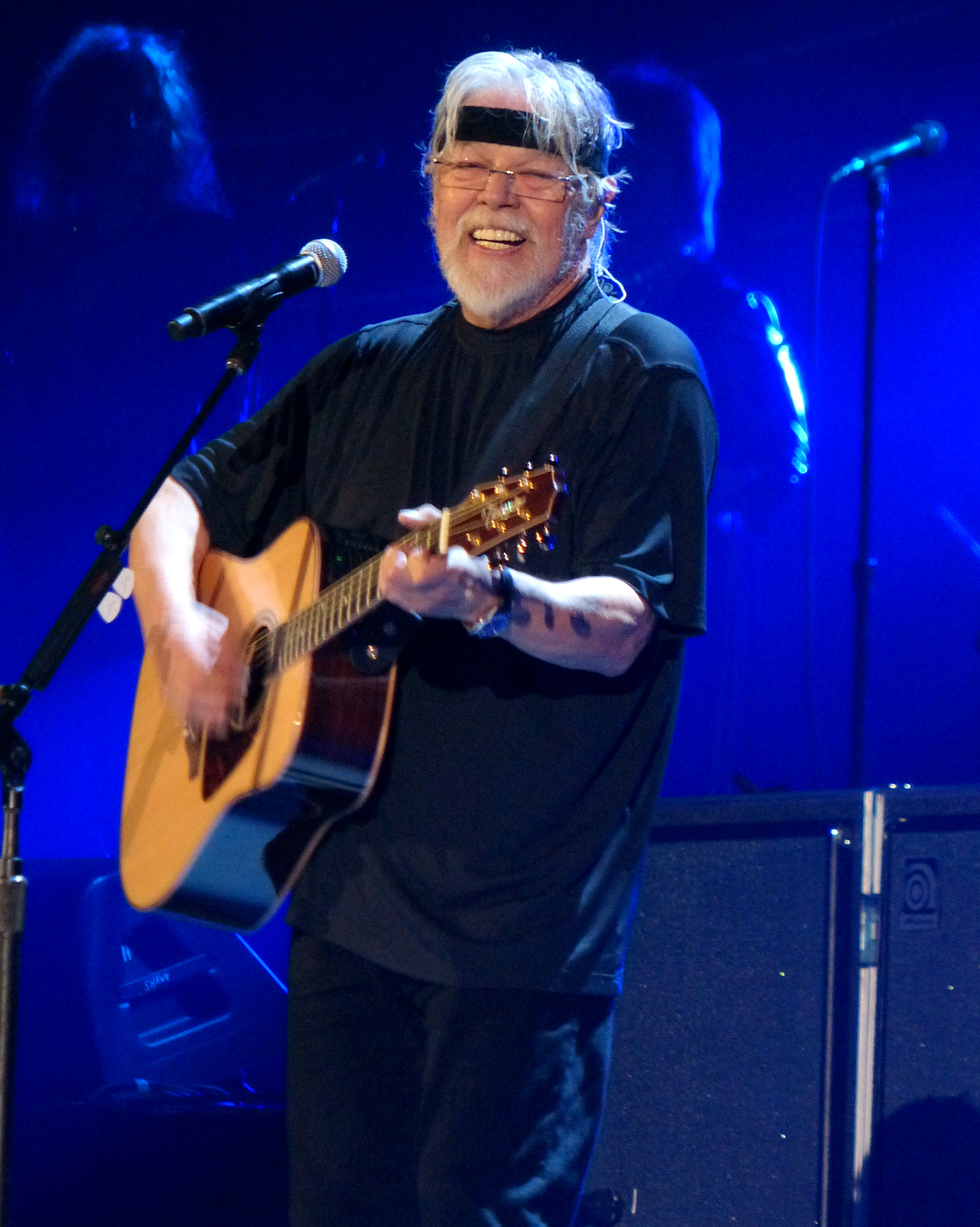
Bob Seger

Yochanan Vollach

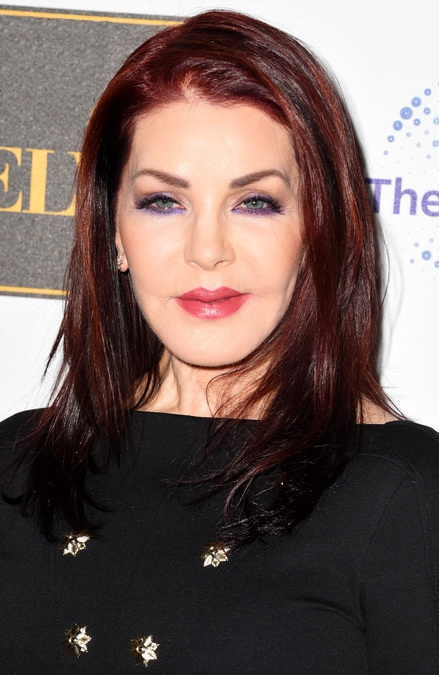
Priscilla Presley

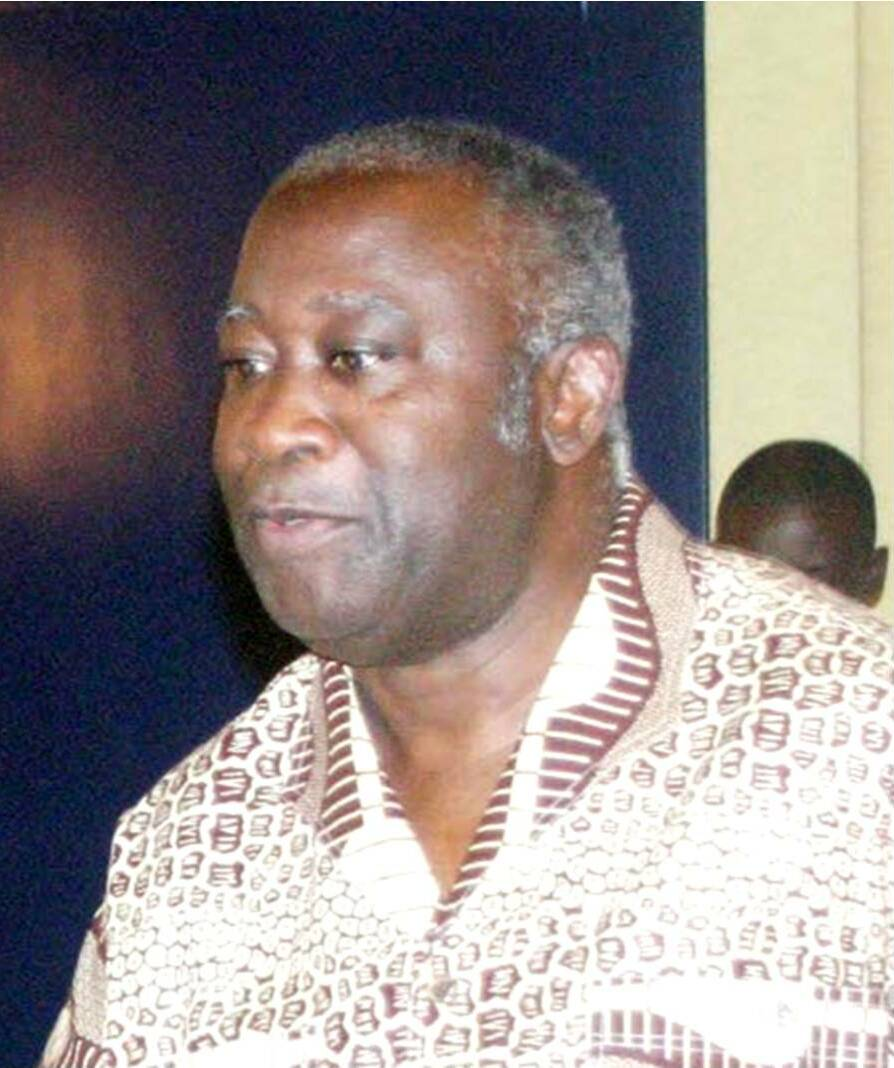
Laurent Gbagbo

- May 1 – Rita Coolidge, American pop singer
- May 2 – Bianca Jagger, Nicaraguan social activist
- May 3 – Jeffrey C. Hall, American geneticist and chronobiologist, Nobel Prize laureate
- May 4
  - David Magson, Australian-British mathematician and businessman
  - Narasimhan Ram, Indian journalist
- May 6 – Bob Seger, American rock singer
- May 7 – Robin Strasser, American actress
- May 8 – Keith Jarrett, American musician
- May 9 – Jupp Heynckes, German footballer and manager
- May 11
  - Mary Cooney, American politician
  - Hilda Pérez Carvajal, Venezuelan biologist
- May 13 – Tammam Salam, 34th Prime Minister of Lebanon
- May 14 – Yochanan Vollach, Israeli footballer and president of Maccabi Haifa, CEO
- May 15 – Duarte Pio, Duke of Braganza, heir to the Portuguese crown
- May 17 – Tony Roche, Australian tennis player
- May 19 – Pete Townshend, English rock guitarist, lyricist (The Who)
- May 20 – Anton Zeilinger, Austrian quantum physicist, Nobel Prize laureate
- May 21
  - Richard Hatch, American actor (Battlestar Galactica) (d. 2017)
  - Ernst Messerschmid, German physicist, astronaut
- May 22 – Victoria Wyndham, American actress (Another World)
- May 23
  - Lauren Chapin, American child actress, evangelist
  - Doris Mae Oulton, Canadian community developer
- May 24 – Priscilla Presley, American actress, businesswoman
- May 28
  - Patch Adams, American physician, comedian, social activist, clown and author
  - John Fogerty, American rock singer (Creedence Clearwater Revival)
- May 29
  - Gary Brooker, English rock keyboardist and singer-songwriter (Procol Harum) (d. 2022)
  - Jean-Pierre Van Rossem, Belgian businessman, fraudster and politician (d. 2018)
- May 30
  - Andrea Bronfman, American philanthropist (d. 2006)
  - Gladys Horton, American singer (The Marvelettes) (d. 2011)
- May 31
  - Rainer Werner Fassbinder, German film director (d. 1982)
  - Laurent Gbagbo, President of Côte d'Ivoire

=== June ===
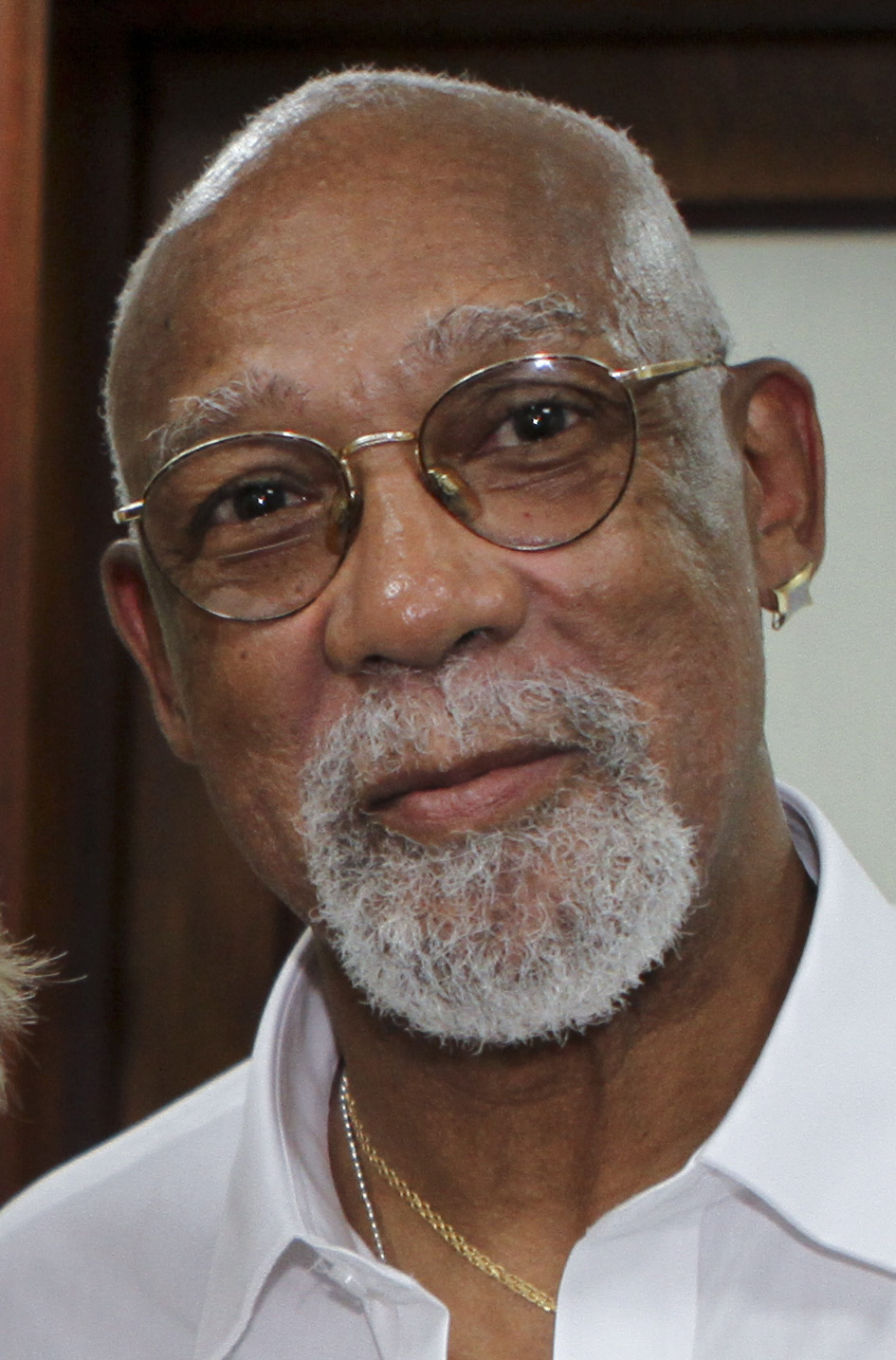
John Carlos

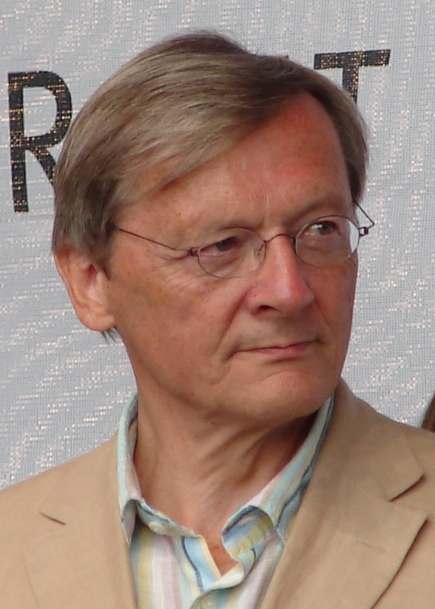
Wolfgang Schüssel

- June 1 – Frederica von Stade, American mezzo-soprano
- June 2 – Jon Peters, American film producer
- June 3 – Hale Irwin, American professional golfer
- June 4 – Anthony Braxton, American composer and musical instrumentalist
- June 5
  - John Carlos, American athlete
  - Théophile Georges Kassab, Catholic prelate (d. 2013)
  - Nechama Rivlin, Israeli socialite, 10th First lady of Israel (d. 2019)
- June 6 – David Dukes, American actor (d. 2000)
- June 7 – Wolfgang Schüssel, Chancellor of Austria
- June 9 – Nike Wagner, German woman of the theater
- June 10 – Benny Gallagher, Scottish singer-songwriter and multi-instrumentalist, half of duo Gallagher and Lyle
- June 11 – Adrienne Barbeau, American actress, television personality and author (Maude)
- June 12 – Pat Jennings, Northern Irish footballer
- June 14 – Jörg Immendorff, German painter
- June 15
  - Françoise Chandernagor, French writer
  - Miriam Defensor Santiago, Filipino politician (d. 2016)
- June 16
  - Claire Alexander, Canadian ice hockey player
  - Ivan Lins, Latin Grammy-winning Brazilian musician
- June 17
  - P. D. T. Acharya, Secretary General, Indian Lok Sabha
  - Art Bell, American radio talk show host (Coast to Coast AM) (d. 2018)
  - Malevo Ferreyra, Argentine police chief and murderer (d. 2008)
  - Ken Livingstone, British politician
  - Eddy Merckx, Belgian cyclist
- June 19
  - Radovan Karadžić, Serbian politician
  - Aung San Suu Kyi, Myanmar politician and poet, Nobel Peace Prize recipient
- June 20 – Anne Murray, Canadian singer
- June 21
  - Roberto D'Angelo, Italian slalom canoeist
  - Luis Castañeda Lossio, Peruvian politician
  - Thiagarajan, Indian actor, director and producer
  - Nirmalendu Goon, Bangladeshi poet
  - Marijana Lubej, Slovenian sprinter
- June 22
  - Juma Kapuya, Tanzanian politician
  - Dieter Versen, German football defender (d. 2025)
- June 23
  - Ana Chumachenco, Italian violinist
  - Kim Småge, Norwegian novelist, crime fiction writer, writer of short stories and children's writer
- June 24
  - George Pataki, Governor of New York
  - Betty Stöve, Dutch tennis player
  - Ali Akbar Velayati, Iranian physician, politician
- June 25
  - Lali Armengol, Spanish playwright, professor and theater director
  - Mohammed Bakar, Malaysian footballer
  - Carolyn Cheeks Kilpatrick, American politician
  - Baba Gana Kingibe, Nigerian politician
  - Guillermo Mendoza, Mexican cyclist
  - Chaiyasit Shinawatra, commander-in-chief of the Royal Thai Army
- June 26 – Paul Chun, Hong Kong actor
- June 27
  - Jose Miguel Arroyo, First Gentleman of the Philippines
  - Ami Ayalon, Israeli politician
  - Norma Kamali, American fashion designer
  - Catherine Lacoste, French amateur golfer
  - Lu Sheng-yen, Taiwanese leader of the True Buddha School
- June 28
  - Ken Buchanan, Scottish undisputed world lightweight boxing champion (d. 2023)
  - Raul Seixas, Brazilian rock singer (d. 1989)
- June 29 – Chandrika Kumaratunga, 5th President of Sri Lanka
- June 30
  - Kevin Jackman, Australian rules footballer
  - Jerry Kenney, American Major League Baseball infielder
  - Sean Scully, Irish-American-based painter, printmaker
  - James Snyder Jr., American author, attorney and politician
  - Bob Klose, british photographer, printmaker and musician

=== July ===
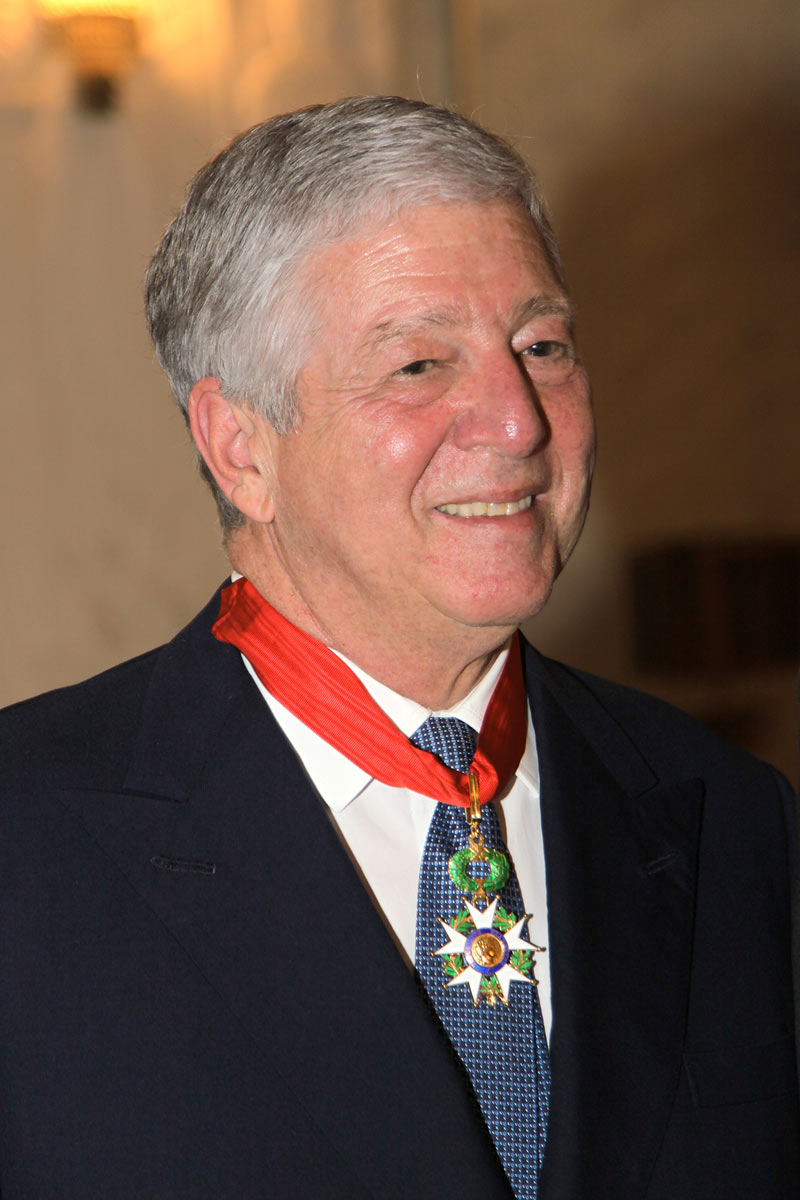
Alexander, Crown Prince of Yugoslavia

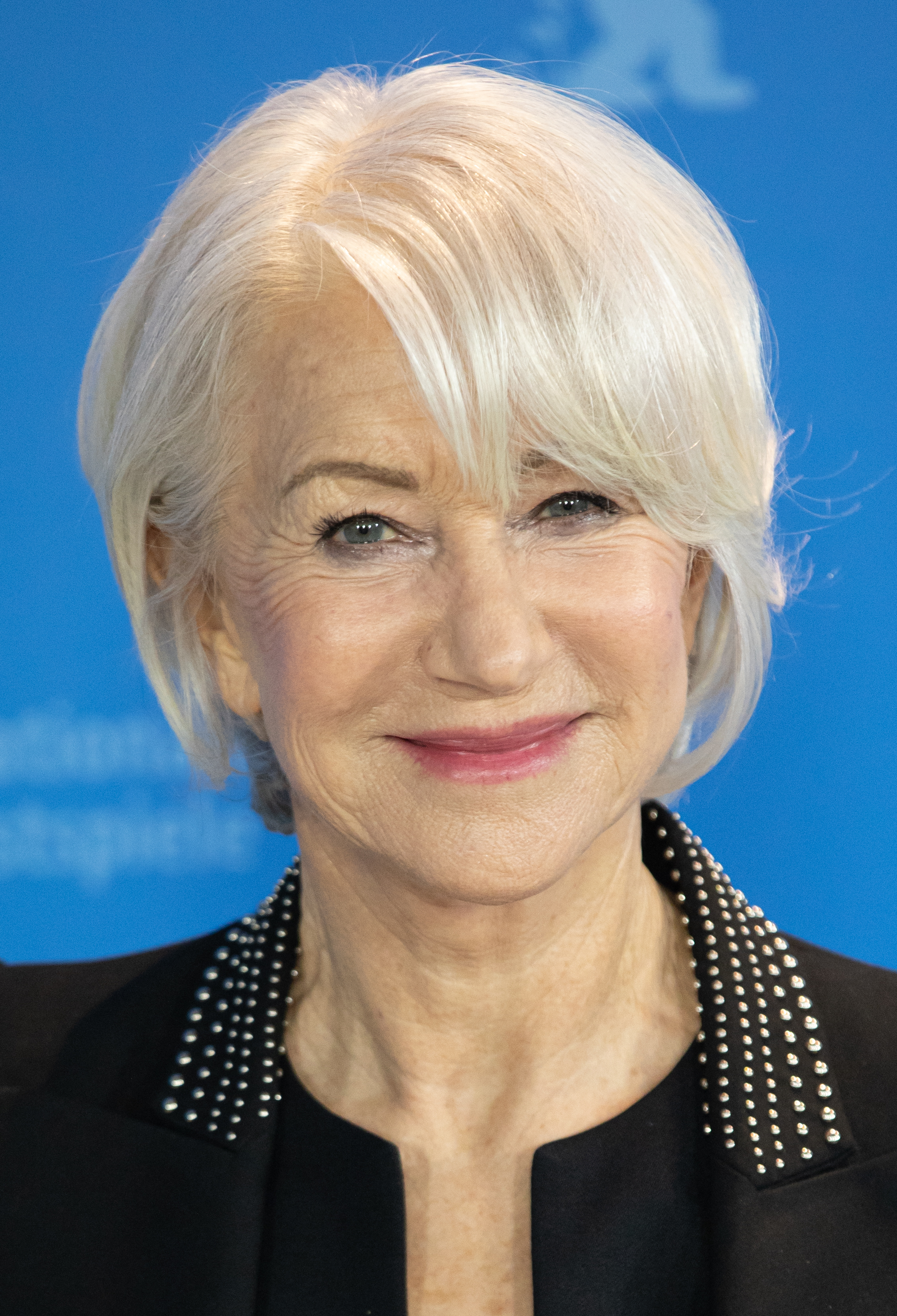
Dame Helen Mirren

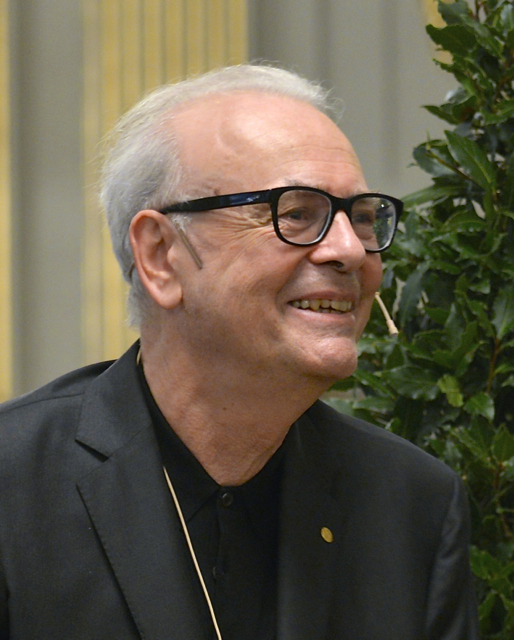
Patrick Modiano

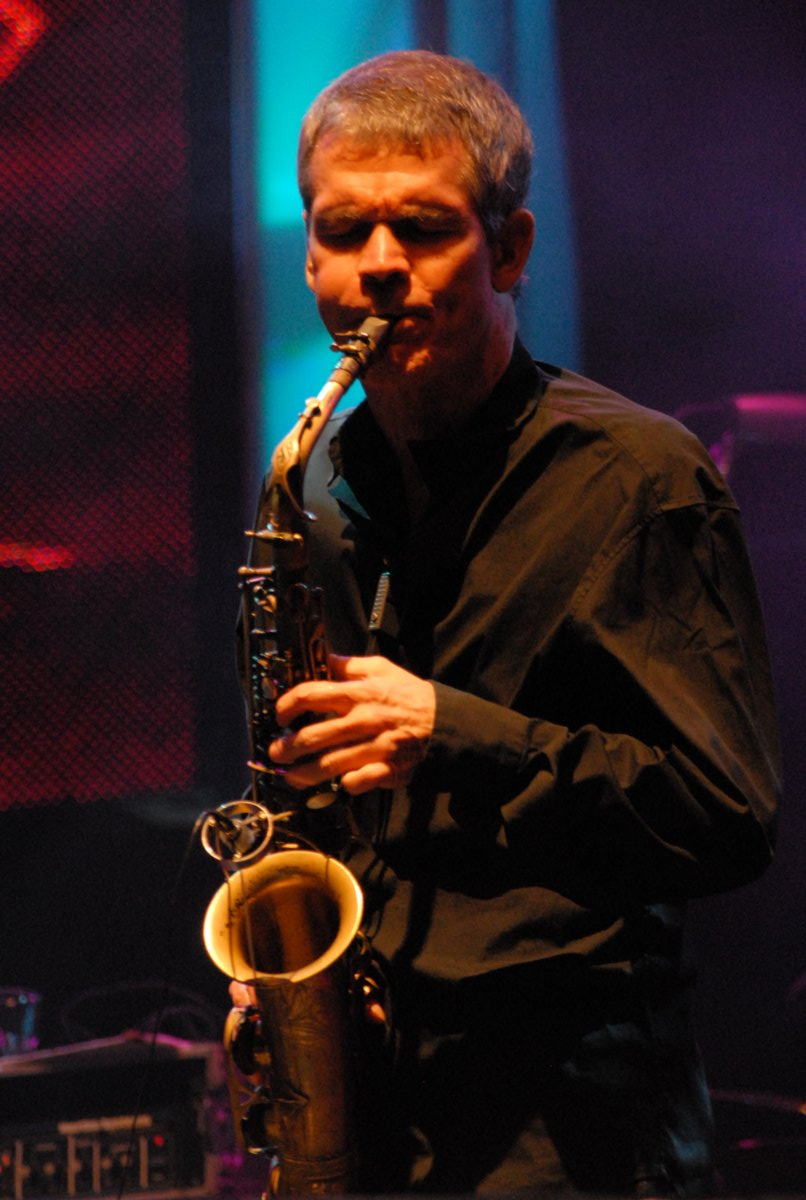
David Sanborn

- July 1
  - Jane Cederqvist, Swedish freestyle swimmer
  - Visu, Indian writer, director, stage, actor and talk-show host (d. 2020)
  - Billy Rohr, American Major League Baseball player
  - Debbie Harry, American rock singer (Blondie)
- July 2 – Linda Warren, American author
- July 3 – Thomas Mapfumo, Zimbabwean musician
- July 4
  - Tiong Thai King, Malaysian politician
  - Steinar Amundsen, Norwegian sprint canoeist
- July 5
  - Nurul Islam Nahid, Bangladeshi politician
  - Miroslav Mišković, Serbian business magnate, investor
- July 6 – Burt Ward, American actor (Batman)
- July 7
  - Heloísa Pinheiro, Brazilian model, businesswoman
  - Manuel Chaves, Spanish politician
  - Moncef Marzouki, Tunisian politician; 4th President of Tunisia
  - Li Chi-an, North Korean football striker
  - Matti Salminen, Finnish bass singer
- July 8 – Micheline Calmy-Rey, Swiss Federal Councilor
- July 9
  - Dean Koontz, American writer
  - Mohammad Reza Nematzadeh, Iranian politician, engineer
- July 10
  - Zlatko Tomčić, Croatian politician
  - Daniel Ona Ondo, Gabonese politician
  - Virginia Wade, English professional tennis player
  - Ron Glass, African-American actor (d. 2016)
- July 11 – Richard Wesley, American playwright, screenwriter
- July 12
  - Leopoldo Mastelloni, Italian actor, comedian and singer
  - Thor Martinsen, Norwegian ice hockey player
- July 14 – Antun Vujić, Croatian politician, philosopher, political analyst, lexicographer and author
- July 15
  - Hong Ra-hee, South Korean billionaire businesswoman, philanthropist
  - Jürgen Möllemann, German politician (d. 2003)
  - Jan-Michael Vincent, American actor (d. 2019)
- July 16
  - Victor Sloan, Irish artist
  - Çetin Tekindor, Turkish actor
  - Roy Ho Ten Soeng, Dutch politician
  - Jos Stelling, Dutch film director, screenwriter
- July 17
  - Eduardo Olivera, Mexican modern pentathlete
  - Kim Won-hong, North Korean politician, military leader
  - Alexander, Crown Prince of Yugoslavia
- July 19
  - Oleg Fotin, Russian swimmer
  - Richard Henderson, Scottish molecular biologist, Nobel Prize laureate
  - Uri Rosenthal, Dutch politician
- July 20
  - Kim Carnes, American singer-songwriter (Bette Davis Eyes)
  - Lothar Koepsel, German sailor
  - Simbarashe Mumbengegwi, Zimbabwean politician and diplomat
  - Nicole Laroche, French engineer, in 1964 became first female Gadzarts, at the École nationale supérieure d'arts et métiers engineering grande ecole
- July 21
  - John Lowe, English darts player
  - Barry Richards, South African batsman
- July 23 – Edie McClurg, American actress
- July 24 – Azim Premji, Indian businessman
- July 26
  - Helen Mirren, British actress
- July 28 – Jim Davis, American cartoonist (Garfield)
- July 30
  - Roger Dobkowitz, American producer
  - Patrick Modiano, French novelist, Nobel Prize laureate
  - David Sanborn, American saxophonist (d. 2024)

=== August ===
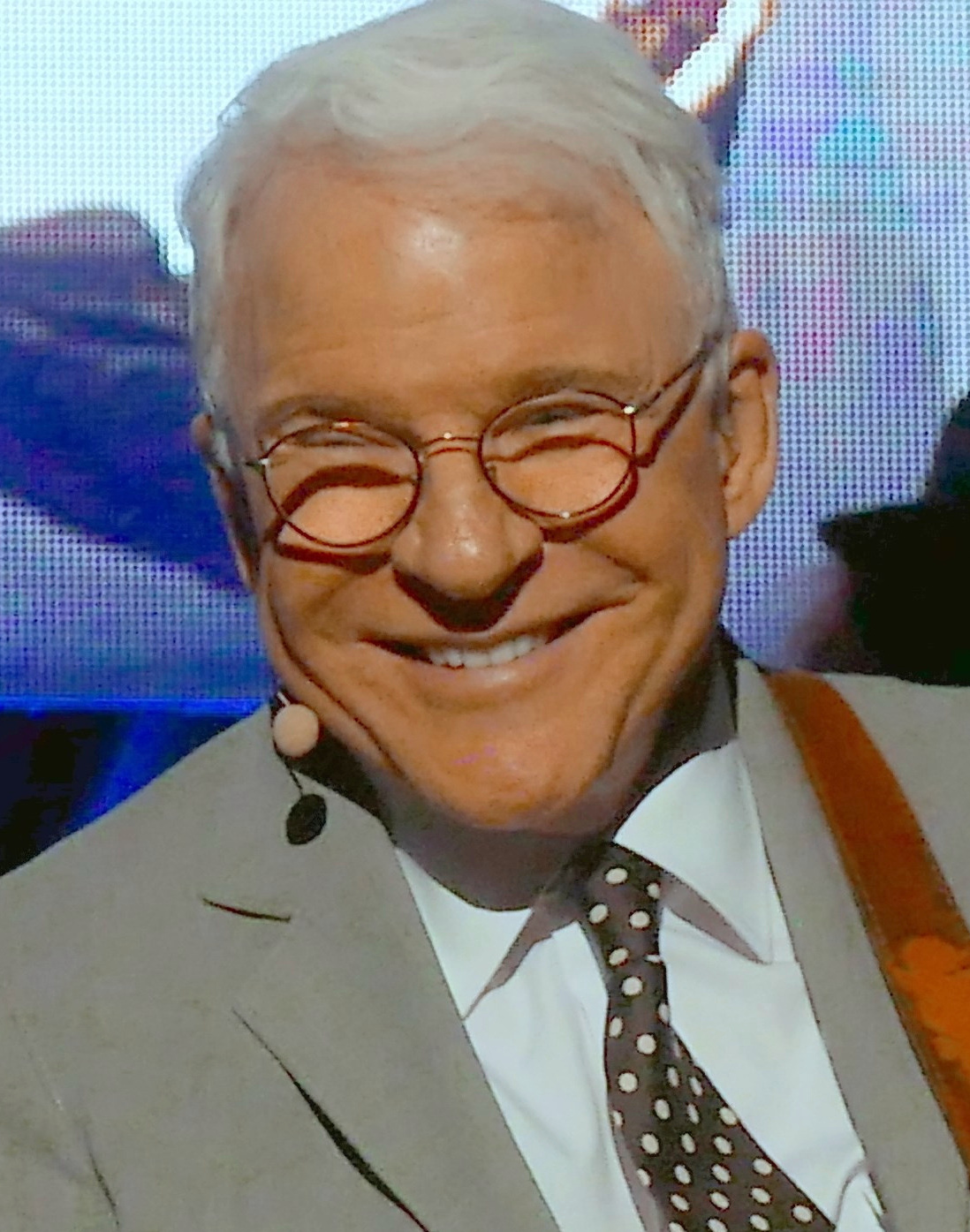
Steve Martin

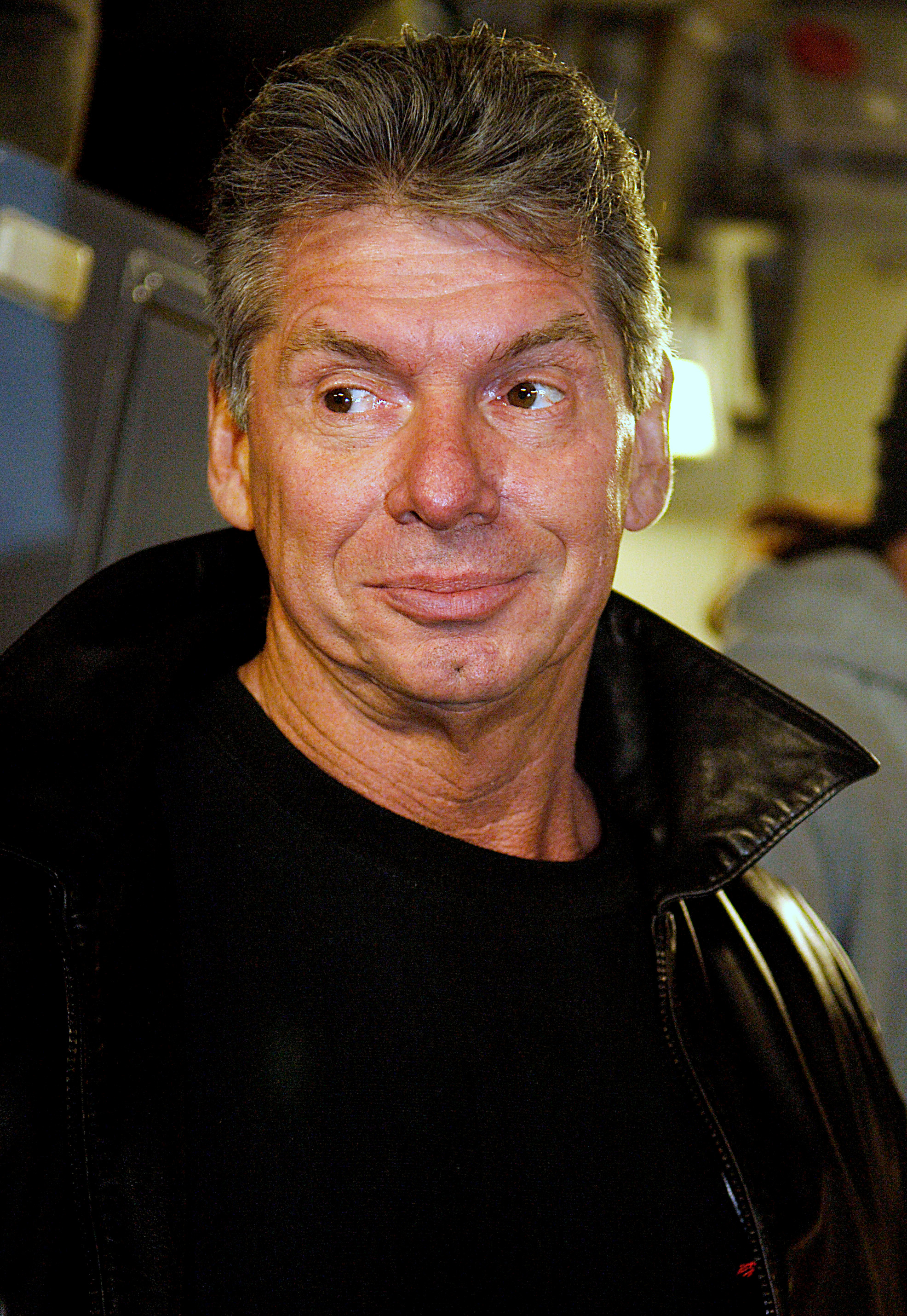
Vince McMahon

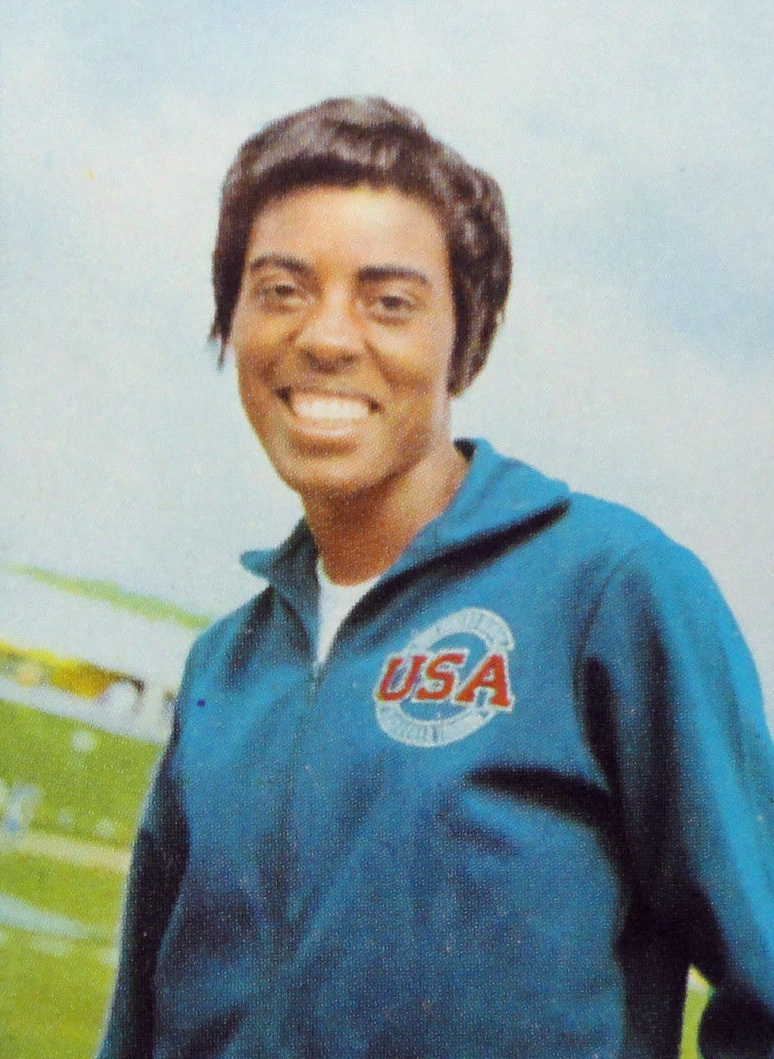
Wyomia Tyus

- August 1 – Douglas Osheroff, American physicist, Nobel Prize laureate
- August 4 – Alan Mulally, American businessman, CEO of the Ford Motor Company
- August 5 – Loni Anderson, American actress (WKRP in Cincinnati) (d. 2025)
- August 8 – Julie Anne Robinson, British theatre, television, film director and producer
- August 9 – Posy Simmonds, English cartoonist
- August 12
  - Ron Mael, American musician (Sparks)
  - J. D. McClatchy, American poet and literary critic (d. 2018)
- August 14
  - Steve Martin, American actor and comedian
  - Valeriy Shmarov, Ukrainian politician (d. 2018)
  - Eliana Pittman, Brazilian singer, actress
  - Faustin Twagiramungu, Prime Minister of Rwanda (d. 2023)
  - Wim Wenders, German film director, producer
- August 15
  - Bobby Treviño, Mexican baseball player (d. 2018)
  - Miyuki Matsuhisa, Japanese artistic gymnast
  - Khaleda Zia, Bangladesh politician, Prime Minister of Bangladesh (d. 2025)
- August 17 – Katri Helena, Finnish singer
- August 19 – Ian Gillan, English rock singer (Deep Purple)
- August 22
  - David Chase, American writer, director and television producer
  - Ron Dante, American rock singer-songwriter and record producer (The Archies)
- August 24 – Vincent K. "Vince" McMahon, American professional wrestling promoter, chairman and CEO of WWE
- August 25 – Daniel Hulet, Belgian cartoonist (d. 2011)
- August 26 – Tom Ridge, American politician
- August 27 – Marianne Sägebrecht, German film actress
- August 29
  - Alyosha Abrahamyan, Armenian football player (d. 2018)
  - Wyomia Tyus, American Olympic athlete
- August 31
  - Sir Van Morrison, Irish rock musician
  - Itzhak Perlman, Israeli-born American violinist, conductor

=== September ===
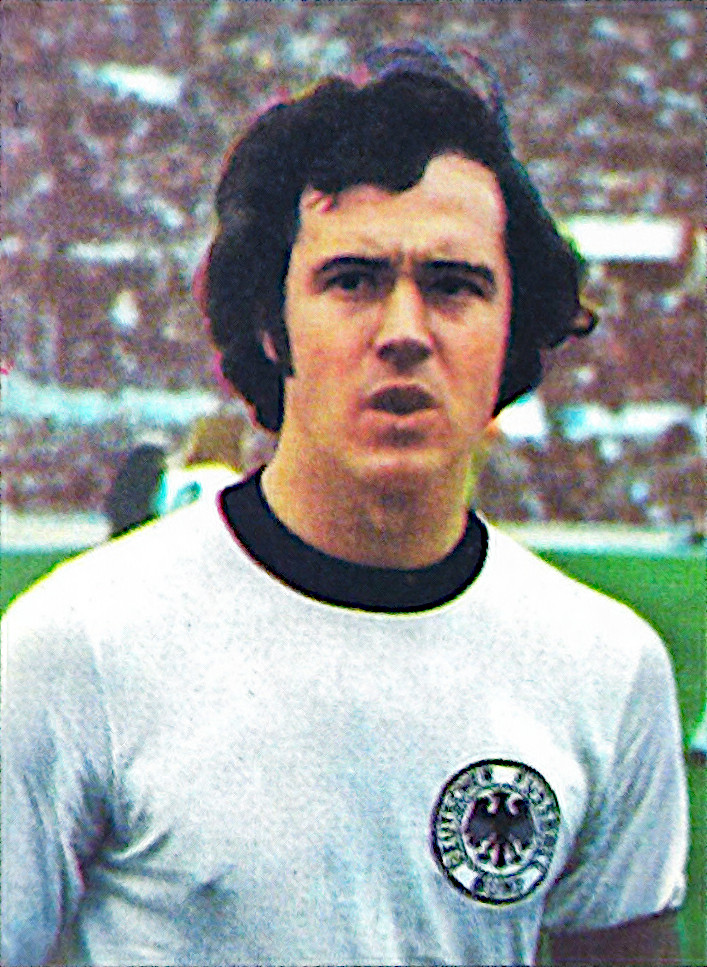
Franz Beckenbauer

- September 1
  - Mustafa Balel, Turkish writer
  - Abdrabbuh Mansour Hadi, 2nd president of Yemen (d. 2026)
- September 5
  - K. N. T. Sastry, Indian film critic, director and writer (d. 2018)
  - Al Stewart, Scottish singer-songwriter (Year of the Cat)
- September 6 – Victor Ramahatra, 5th Prime Minister of Madagascar
- September 7 – Jacques Lemaire, Canadian ice hockey coach
- September 8
  - Ron "Pigpen" McKernan, American musician (Grateful Dead) (d. 1973)
  - Rogatien Vachon, Canadian ice hockey player
- September 10 – José Feliciano, Puerto Rican-American singer ("Feliz Navidad")
- September 11 – Franz Beckenbauer, German footballer and manager (d. 2024)
- September 12 – Richard Thaler, American economist
- September 14
  - Benjamin Harjo Jr., Native American artist
  - Thomas M. Holcomb, American politician and former member of the Michigan House of Representatives (d. 2024).
- September 15 – Jessye Norman, American soprano (d. 2019)
- September 16 – Pat Stevens, American voice actress (d. 2010)
- September 17
  - Phil Jackson, American basketball coach
  - Bruce Spence, Australian actor
- September 18
  - John McAfee, British-American computer programmer and businessman (d. 2021)
  - P. F. Sloan, American singer-songwriter (d. 2015)
- September 19 - Randolph Mantooth, American actor
- September 21
  - Shaw Clifton, Northern Ireland-born General of the Salvation Army
  - Kay Ryan, American poet
- September 22 – Gonzaguinha, Brazilian singer, composer (d. 1991)
- September 24 – John Rutter, English choral composer, conductor
- September 26
  - Bryan Ferry, English singer-songwriter and musician (Roxy Music)
  - Gal Costa, Brazilian singer (d. 2022)
  - Louise Beaudoin, Canadian politician
- September 27 – Jack Goldstein, Canadian artist (d. 2003)
- September 29 – Nadezhda Chizhova, Russian athlete
- September 30
  - Ehud Olmert, 12th Prime Minister of Israel
  - Ralph Siegel, German record producer, songwriter

=== October ===
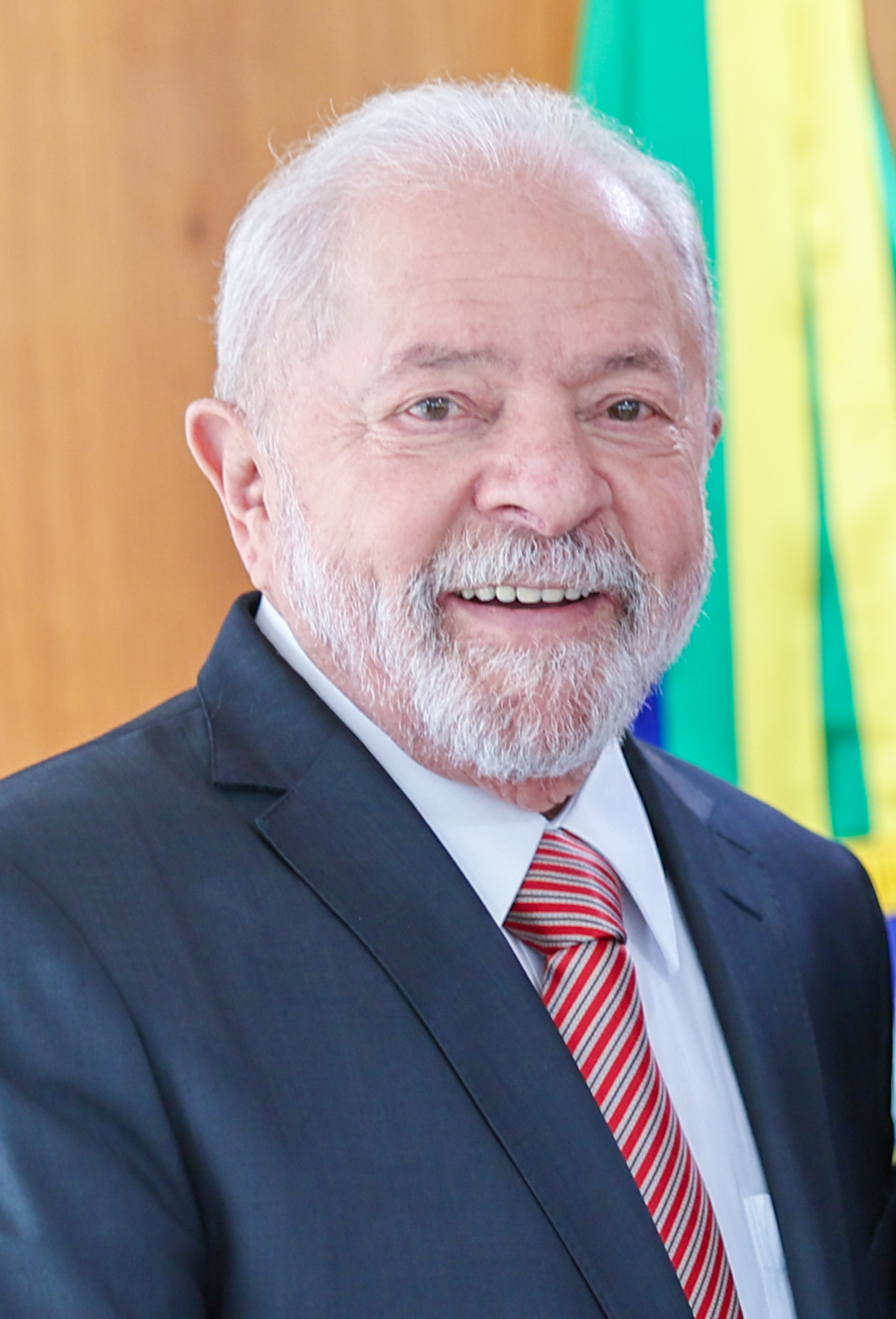
Luiz Inácio Lula da Silva

- October 1
  - Rod Carew, Panamanian-American baseball player
  - Donny Hathaway, African-American soul singer-songwriter (d. 1979)
  - Ram Nath Kovind, 14th President of India
- October 2
  - Regina Torné, Mexican actress, singer and television presenter
  - Don McLean, American singer-songwriter ("American Pie")
- October 3 – Viktor Saneyev, Soviet athlete and Olympic champion (d. 2022)
- October 6 – Ivan Graziani, Italian singer-songwriter (d. 1997)
- October 9
  - Vijaya Kumaratunga, Sri Lankan actor and politician (d. 1988)
  - Archbishop Nikon of Boston, Albanian bishop (d. 2019)
- October 12
  - Aurore Clément, French actress
  - Dusty Rhodes, American wrestler (d. 2015)
- October 18
  - Norio Wakamoto, Japanese voice actor
  - Yıldo, Turkish showman, footballer
- October 19
  - Angus Deaton, Scottish-born economist, recipient of the Nobel Memorial Prize in Economic Sciences
  - John Lithgow, American actor (Third Rock from the Sun)
- October 22 – Yvan Ponton, Canadian actor, sportscaster
- October 23 – Kim Larsen, Danish rock musician (d. 2018)
- October 24
  - Eugenie Scott, American Executive Director of the National Center for Science Education
  - Sean Solomon, American Principal Investigator of NASA's MESSENGER mission to Mercury and director of the Department of Terrestrial Magnetism at the Carnegie Institution for Science
- October 25
  - Peter Ledger, Australian artist (d. 1994)
  - David Schramm, American astrophysicist and educator (d. 1997)
  - Keaton Yamada, Japanese voice actor
- October 26
  - Pat Conroy, American author (d. 2016)
  - Jaclyn Smith, American actress, businesswoman (Charlie's Angels)
- October 27
  - Luiz Inácio Lula da Silva, 35th President of Brazil
  - Carrie Snodgress, American actress (d. 2004)
- October 29
  - Ching Li, Taiwanese actress (d. 2017)
  - Melba Moore, African-American singer, actress
- October 30 – Henry Winkler, American actor, producer and director (Happy Days)

=== November ===
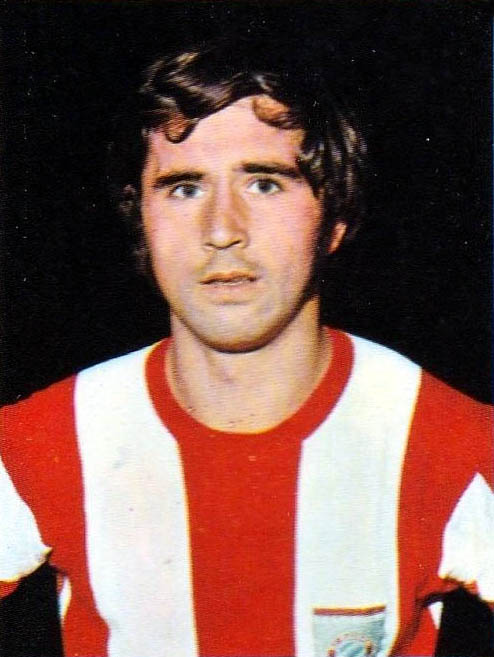
Gerd Müller

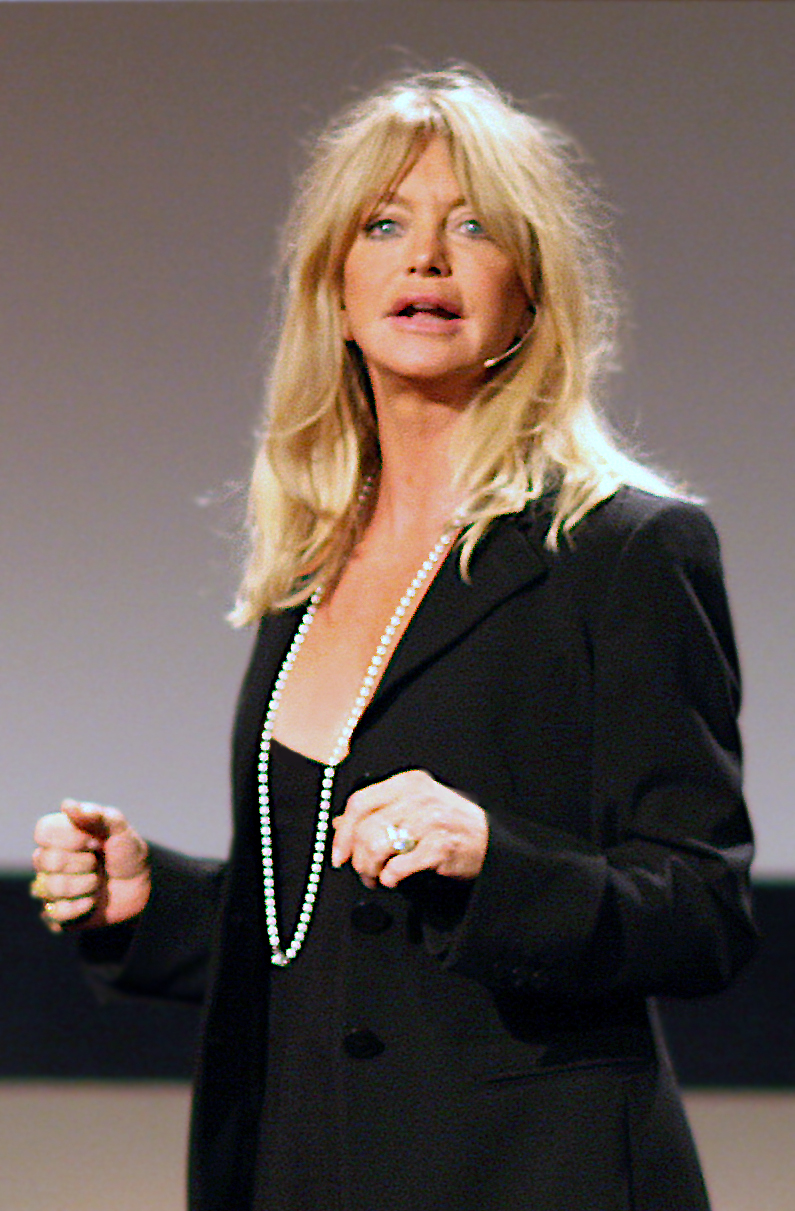
Goldie Hawn

- November 3 – Gerd Müller, German footballer (d. 2021)
- November 5 – Jacques Lanctôt, Canadian terrorist
- November 7
  - Bob Englehart, American editorial cartoonist
  - Waljinah, Javanese singer
- November 8 – Joseph James DeAngelo, American serial killer and serial rapist
- November 9 – Charlie Robinson, African-American actor (d. 2021)
- November 10
  - Madeleine Juneau, Canadian museologist (d. 2020)
  - Thongloun Sisoulith, 17th Prime Minister, 7th President of Laos
- November 11 – Daniel Ortega, 58th and 62nd President of Nicaragua
- November 12 – Neil Young, Canadian singer-songwriter, musician
- November 15 – Anni-Frid Lyngstad, Norwegian-born rock singer (ABBA)
- November 17
  - Elvin Hayes, American basketball player
  - Abdelmadjid Tebboune, President of Algeria
- November 18
  - Wilma Mankiller, Chief of the Cherokee Nation (d. 2010)
  - Mahinda Rajapaksa, Sri Lankan politician, 6th President of Sri Lanka
- November 21 – Goldie Hawn, American actress
  - Kalervo Kummola – Finnish ice hockey executive, businessman, and politician
- November 22 – Kari Tapio, Finnish singer (d. 2010)
- November 23 – Dennis Nilsen, Scottish serial killer (d. 2018)
- November 24 – Nuruddin Farah, Somali novelist
- November 25 – Mary Jo Deschanel, American actress
- November 26 – John McVie, English rock musician (Fleetwood Mac)
- November 27
  - Barbara Anderson, American actress
  - James Avery, African-American actor (d. 2013)
- November 30
  - Roger Glover, English rock musician (Deep Purple)
  - Radu Lupu, Romanian classical pianist (d. 2022)

=== December ===
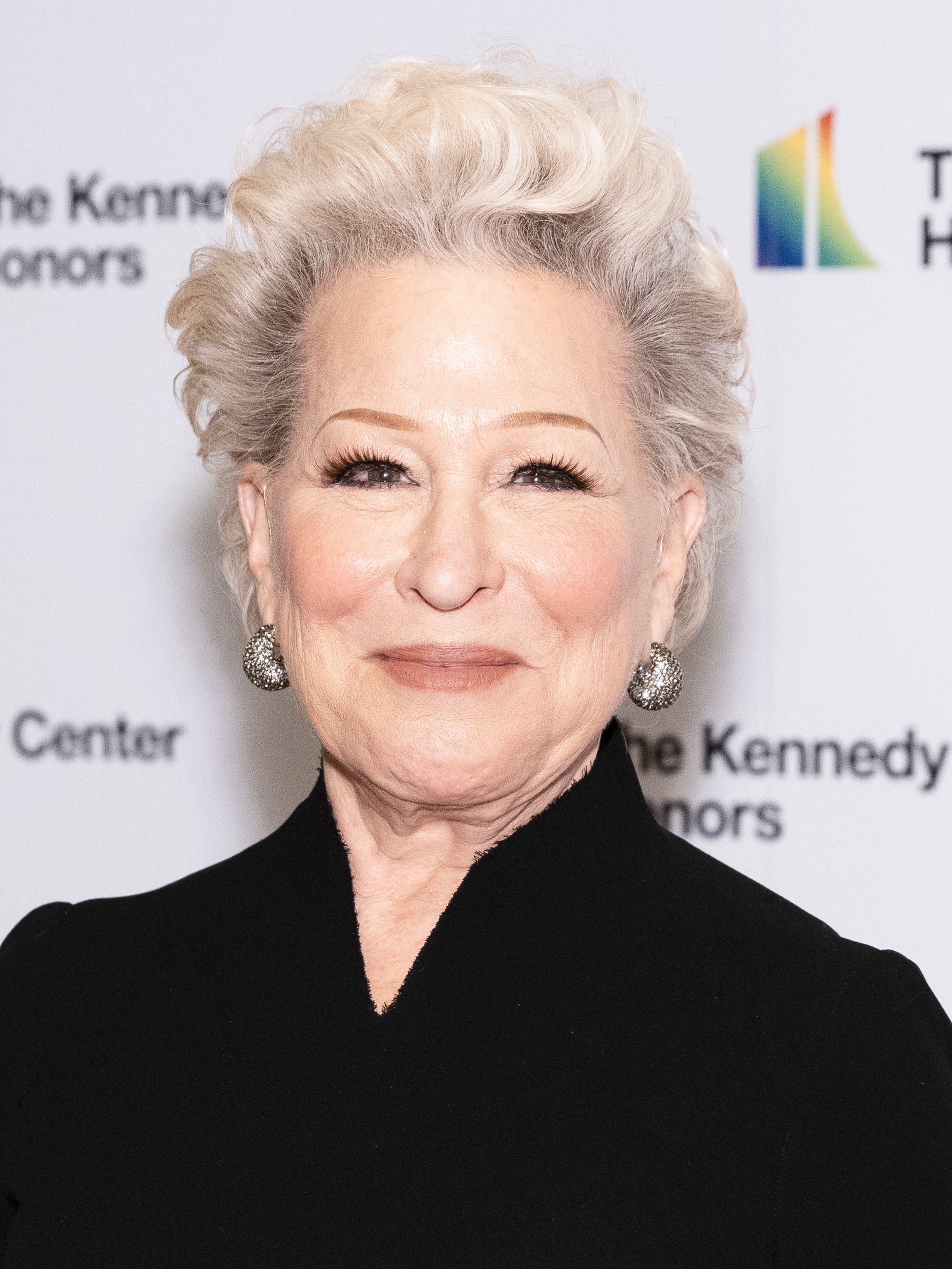
Bette Midler

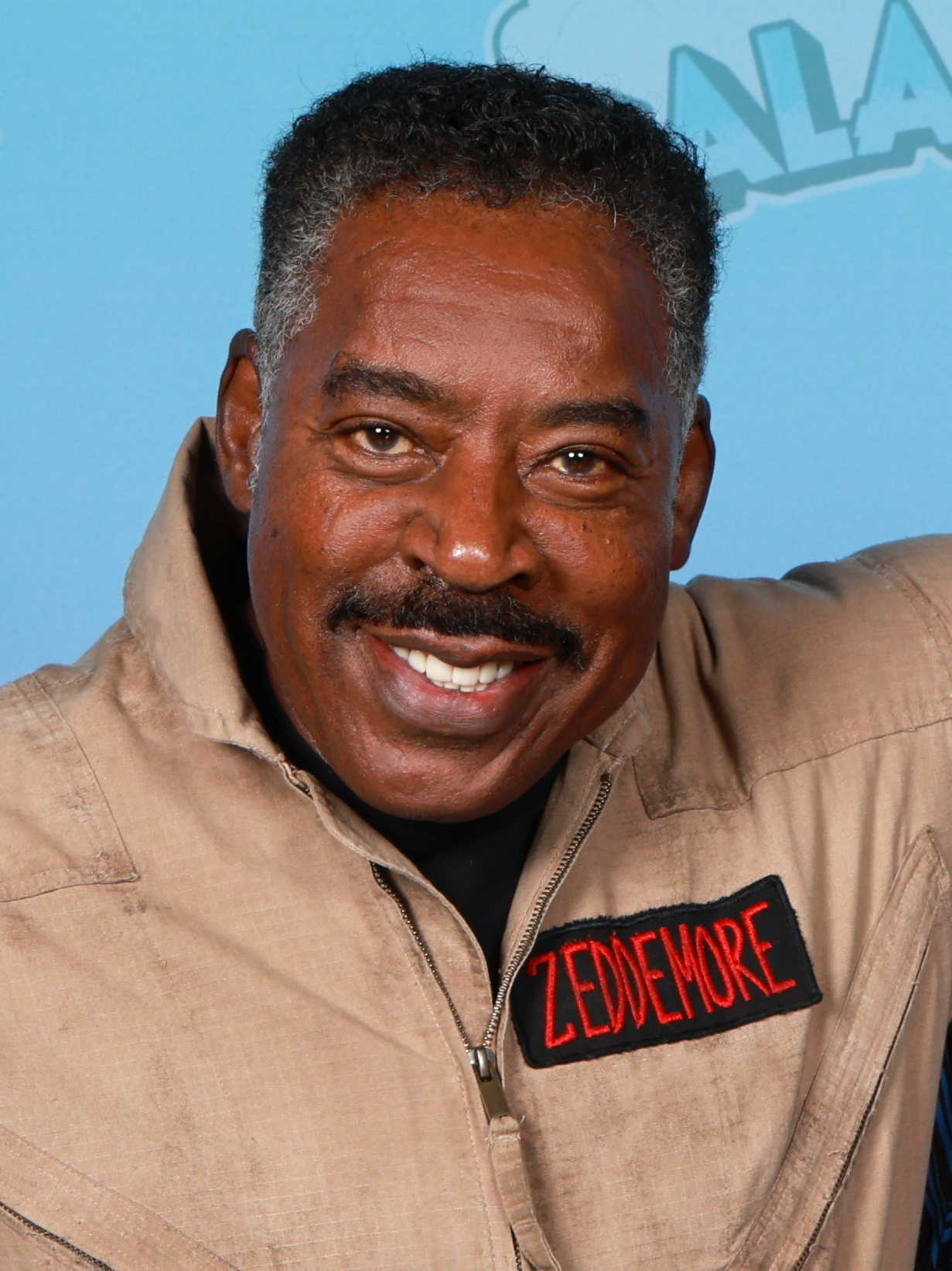
Ernie Hudson

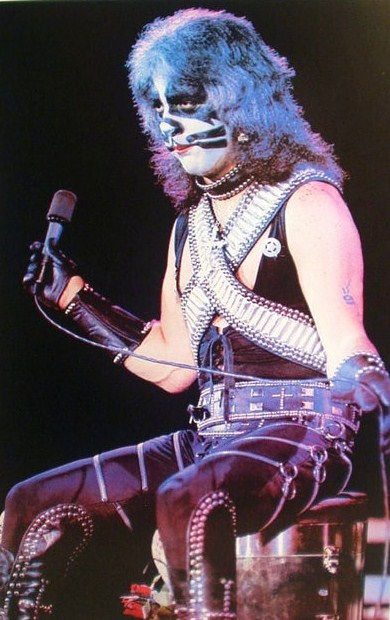
Peter Criss

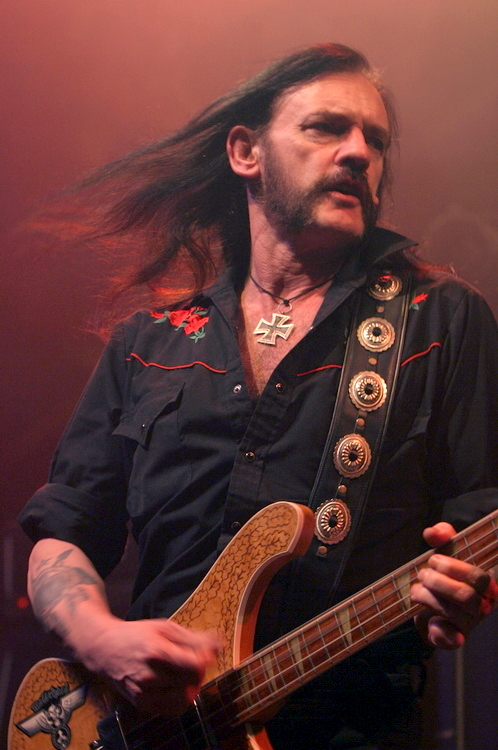
Lemmy

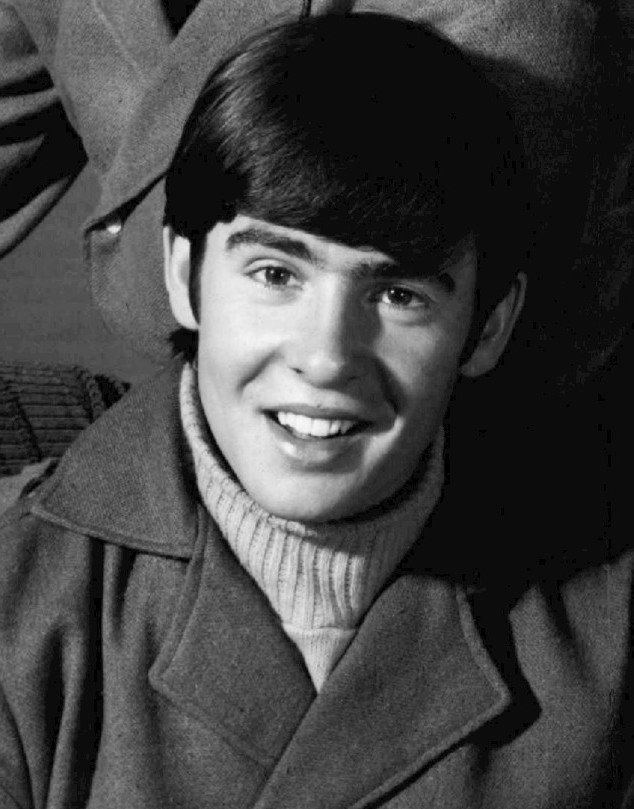
Davy Jones

- December 1
  - Lyle Bien, American vice admiral
  - Bette Midler, American actress, comedian and singer
- December 2 – Tex Watson, American multiple murderer, 'Manson Family' member
- December 3 – Bozhidar Dimitrov, Bulgarian historian, politician and polemicist (d. 2018)
- December 4 – Geoff Emerick, English recording engineer (d. 2018)
- December 7 – Clive Russell, English actor
- December 8 – Julie Heldman, American tennis player
- December 10 – John Ankerberg, American Christian television host, author and speaker
- December 11 – Sharafuddin of Selangor, Sultan of Selangor
- December 12
  - René Pétillon, French satirical, political cartoonist (d. 2018)
  - Portia Simpson-Miller, 2-time Prime Minister of Jamaica
  - Kathy Garver, American actress, author and online radio hostess
  - Donald Pandiangan, Indonesian archery athlete (d. 2008)
  - Heather North, American actress (d. 2017)
- December 15
  - Michael King, New Zealand popular historian, author and biographer (d. 2004)
  - Thaao Penghlis, Australian actor
- December 16 – Patti Deutsch, American voice actress (d. 2017)
- December 17 – Ernie Hudson, African-American actor
- December 18 – Carolyn Wood, American professional swimmer
- December 19
- Claudine Hermann, French physicist (d. 2021)
- Elaine Joyce, American actress, game show panelist
- December 20
  - Peter Criss, American rock drummer (KISS)
  - Sivakant Tiwari, senior legal officer of the Singapore Legal Service (d. 2010)
- December 21 – Mari Lill, Estonian actress
- December 22 – Diane Sawyer, American news journalist
- December 23 – Donald A. Ritchie, American historian
- December 24
  - Lemmy, British singer, bassist (Motörhead) (d. 2015)
  - Nicholas Meyer, American screenwriter, producer, director and novelist
  - Sharafuddin of Selangor, Sultan of Selangor
  - Steve Smith, Canadian actor, comedian and writer
- December 25 – Noel Redding, English musician (d. 2003)
- December 29 – Birendra of Nepal, King of Nepal (d. 2001)
- December 30 – Davy Jones, English-born pop singer, actor (The Monkees) (d. 2012)
- December 31
  - Barbara Carrera, Nicaraguan-American actress
  - Vernon Wells, Australian actor
  - Connie Willis, American fiction writer

== Deaths ==
=== January ===
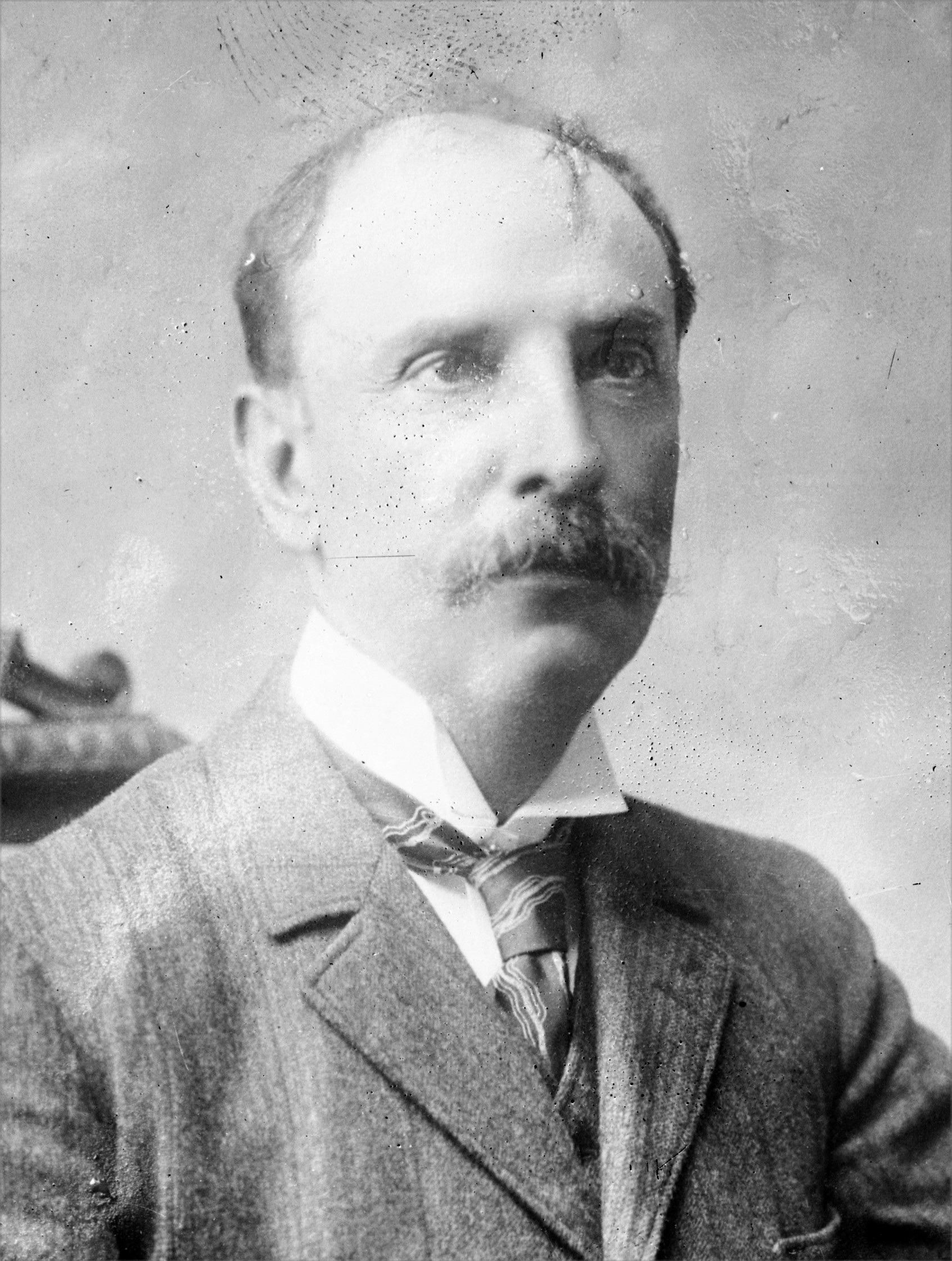
Ricardo Jiménez Oreamuno

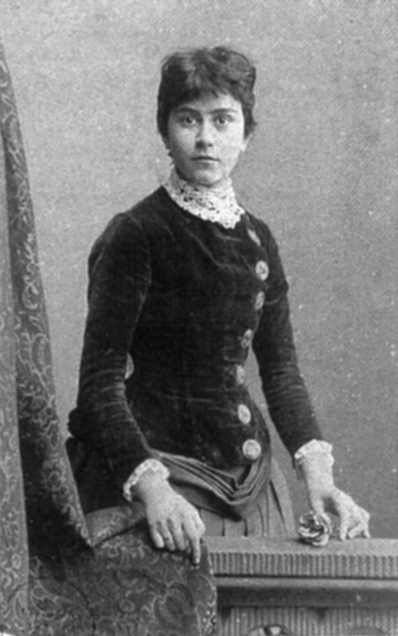
Else Lasker-Schüler

- January 2 – Sir Bertram Ramsay, British admiral (b. 1883)
- January 3 – Edgar Cayce, American mystic (b. 1877)
- January 4 – Ricardo Jiménez Oreamuno, 3-time President of Costa Rica (b. 1859)
- January 6
  - Josefa Llanes Escoda, Filipino women's suffrage advocate, founder of the Girl Scouts of the Philippines (b. 1898)
  - Edith Frank, German-Dutch mother of Anne Frank (b. 1900)
  - Herbert Lumsden, British general (killed in action) (b. 1897)
  - Vladimir Vernadsky, Soviet mineralogist, geochemist (b. 1863)
- January 7
  - Alexander Stirling Calder, American sculptor (b. 1870)
  - Thomas McGuire, American World War II fighter ace (killed in action) (b. 1920)
  - Prince Rainer of Saxe-Coburg and Gotha (killed in action) (b. 1900)
- January 9 – Jüri Uluots, 8th Prime Minister of Estonia (b. 1890)
- January 10 – Pēteris Juraševskis, 8th Prime Minister of Latvia (b. 1872)
- January 12 – Teresio Olivelli, Italian Roman Catholic soldier and venerable (b. 1916)
- January 15 – Pedro Abad Santos, Filipino politician, brother of José Abad Santos (b. 1876)
- January 16 – José Fabella, Filipino physician (b. 1888)
- January 19
  - Petar Bojović, Serbian field marshal (b. 1858)
  - Gustave Mesny, French Army general (b. 1886)
- January 20 – Federico Pedrocchi, Italian artist, writer (killed on active service) (b. 1907)
- January 21
  - Francisco Moreno Fernández, Spanish admiral (b. 1883)
  - Sir Archibald Murray, British Army general (b. 1860)
- January 22 – Else Lasker-Schüler, German poet, author (b. 1869)
- January 23
  - Eugen Bolz, German politician, 20 July Plotter (executed) (b. 1881)
  - Nikolaus Gross, German Roman Catholic layman, martyr and blessed (b. 1898)
  - Newton E. Mason, United States Navy rear admiral (b. 1850)
- January 29 – Hans Conrad Leipelt, Austrian member of the White Rose resistance movement in Nazi Germany (executed) (b. 1921)
- January 30
  - Sir William Goodenough, British admiral (b. 1867)
  - Pedro Paulet, Peruvian scientist (b. 1874)
- January 31 – Eddie Slovik, American soldier (executed for desertion) (b. 1920)

=== February ===
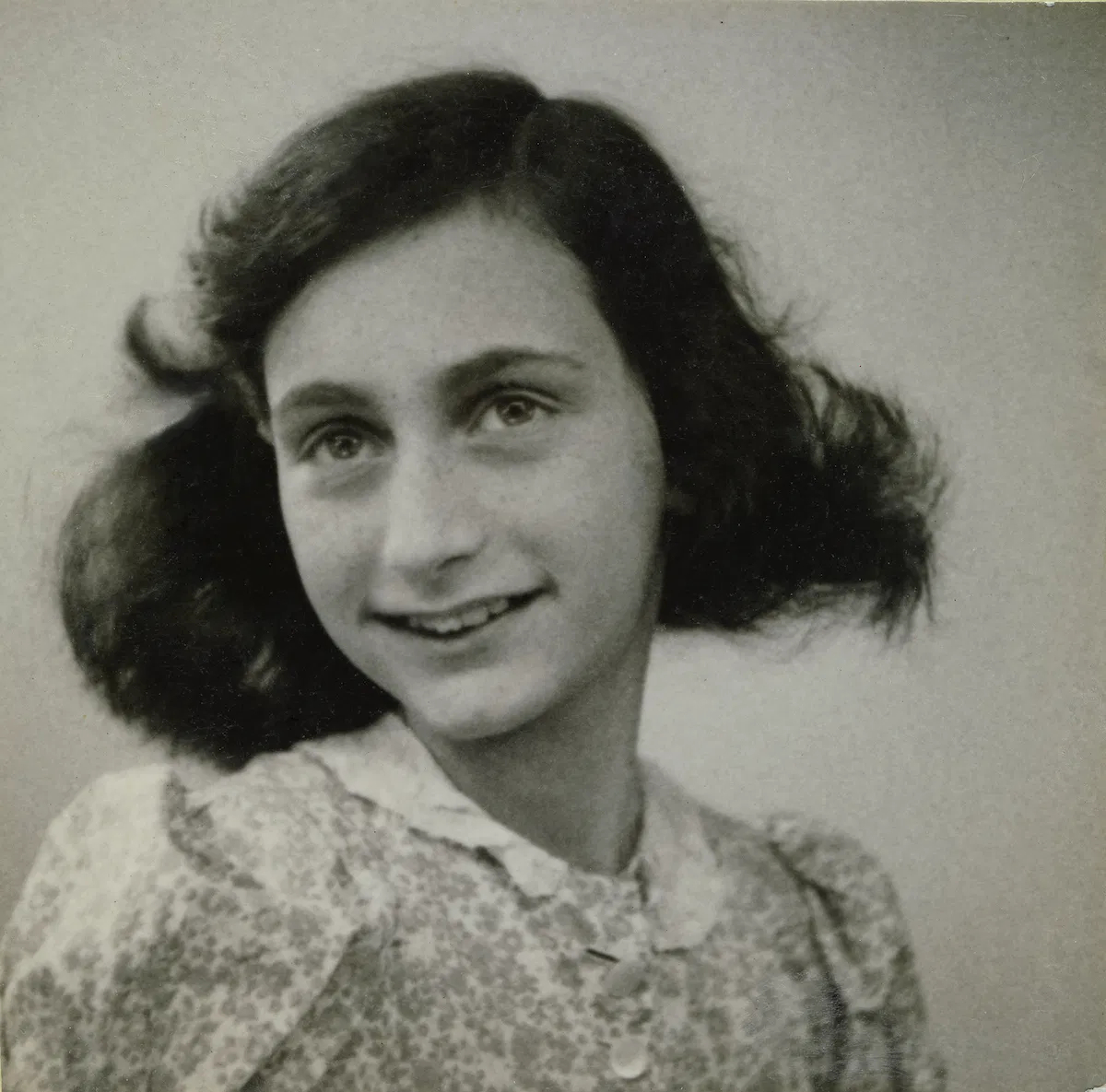
Anne Frank

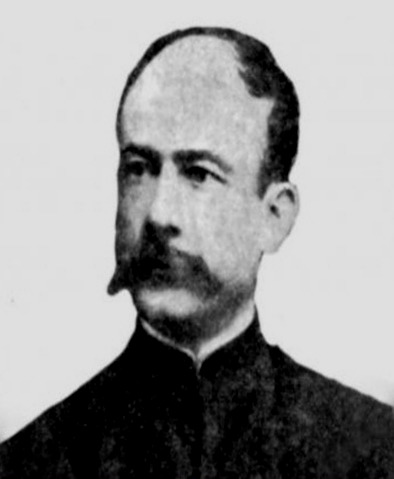
José María Moncada

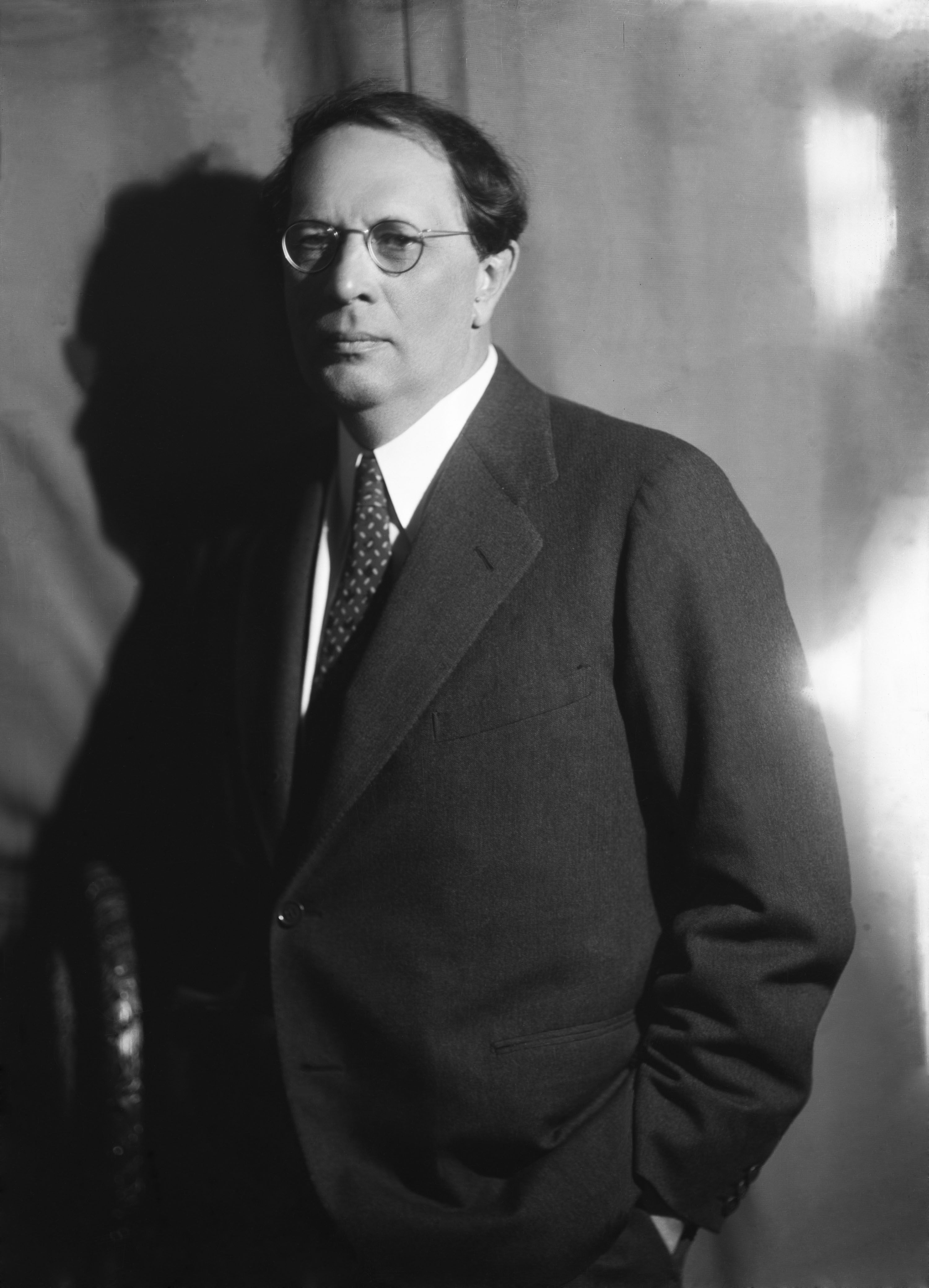
Aleksey Nikolayevich Tolstoy

- February (or March) – Anne Frank, German-born Jewish diarist, writer (typhus in Bergen-Belsen concentration camp) (b. 1929)
- February (probable) – Johnny Jebsen German anti-Nazi working for British intelligence (killed) (b. 1917)
- February 1
  - Ivan Bagryanov, 30th Prime Minister of Bulgaria (executed) (b. 1891)
  - Dobri Bozhilov, 29th Prime Minister of Bulgaria (executed) (b. 1884)
  - Bogdan Filov, Bulgarian archaeologist, historian and politician, 28th Prime Minister of Bulgaria (executed) (b. 1883)
  - Petar Gabrovski, acting Prime Minister of Bulgaria (executed) (b. 1898)
  - Johan Huizinga, Dutch cultural historian (b. 1872)
  - Prince Kiril of Bulgaria (executed) (b. 1895)
- February 2
  - Adolf Brand, German campaigner for homosexuality (air raid victim) (b. 1874)
  - Alfred Delp, German Jesuit priest and philosopher of the German Resistance, 20 July plotter (executed) (b. 1907)
  - Carl Friedrich Goerdeler, German politician, civil servant, executive and economist, 20 July plotter (executed) (b. 1884)
  - Gustav Heistermann von Ziehlberg, German general, 20 July plotter (executed) (b. 1898)
  - Joe Hunt, American tennis champion (military aircraft crash) (b. 1919)
- February 3 – Roland Freisler, Nazi German judge (air raid victim) (b. 1893)
- February 5
  - Denise Bloch, French World War II heroine (executed) (b. 1916)
  - Lilian Rolfe, French World War II heroine (executed) (b. 1914)
  - Violette Szabo, French/British World War II heroine (executed) (b. 1921)
- February 6 – Robert Brasillach, French writer (executed) (b. 1909)
- February 8 – Robert Mallet-Stevens, French architect, designer (b. 1886)
- February 11 – Al Dubin, Swiss-born American songwriter (b. 1891)
- February 13 – Maria Orosa, Filipino technologist, chemist, humanitarian and WWII heroine (air raid victim) (b. 1893)
- February 16 – Otto Kittel, German fighter ace (killed in action) (b. 1917)
- February 18 – Ivan Chernyakhovsky, Soviet general (died of wounds) (b. 1906)
- February 19 – John Basilone, American war hero (killed in action) (b. 1916)
- February 21 – Eric Liddell, British Olympic athlete (in internment camp) (b. 1902)
- February 22 – Sara Josephine Baker, American physician (b. 1873)
- February 23
  - José María Moncada, 19th President of Nicaragua (b. 1870)
  - Aleksei Nikolaevich Tolstoy, Russian writer (b. 1883)
- February 24 – Josef Mayr-Nusser, Italian Roman Catholic layman, martyr and blessed (b. 1910)
- February 25 – Mário de Andrade, Brazilian writer, photographer (b. 1893)
- February 26 – Millard Harmon, American general (b. 1888)

=== March ===
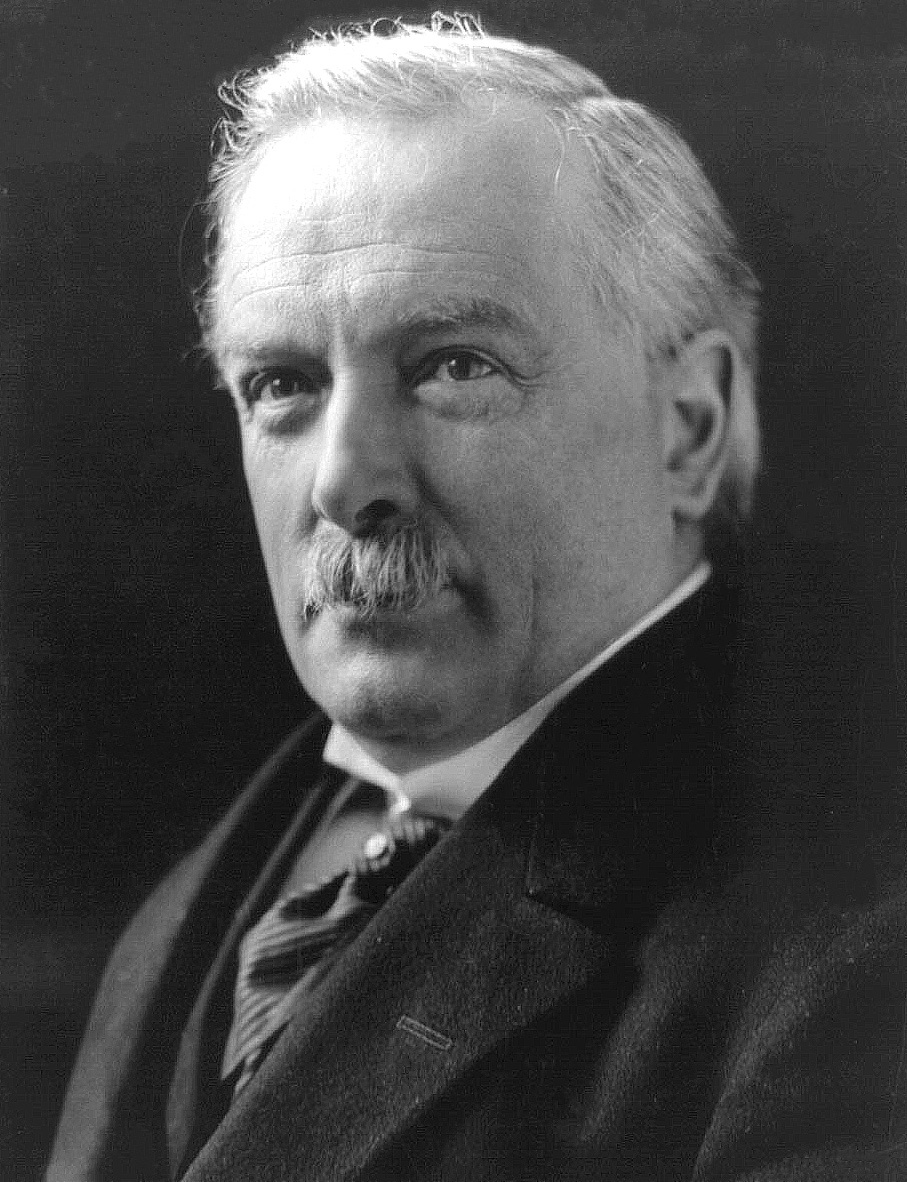
David Lloyd George

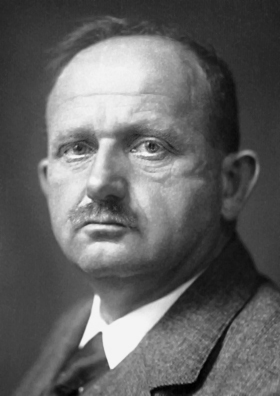
Hans Fischer

- March 2 – Emily Carr, Canadian painter (b. 1871)
- March 3
  - Gheorghe Avramescu, Romanian general (in custody) (b. 1884)
  - Aleksandra Samusenko, Soviet WWII tank commander (died of wounds) (b. 1922)
- March 4
  - Harry Chauvel, Australian Army general (b. 1865)
  - Lucille La Verne, American actress (b. 1872)
  - Mark Sandrich, American film director (b. 1900)
- March 5 – George Alan Vasey, Australian general (killed in military aircraft accident) (b. 1895)
- March 12 – Friedrich Fromm, German Nazi official (executed) (b. 1888)
- March 14 – Francisco Braga, Brazilian composer (b. 1868)
- March 15
  - Sava Caracaș, Romanian general (b. 1890)
  - Pierre Drieu La Rochelle, French writer (b. 1893)
- March 18 – William Grover-Williams, British/French racing driver, war hero (executed) (b. 1903)
- March 19 – Marcel Callo, French Roman Catholic layman, martyr and blessed (in concentration camp) (b. 1921)
- March 20 – Lord Alfred Douglas, English poet (b. 1870)
- March 22
  - Enrico Caviglia, Italian marshal (b. 1862)
  - Heinrich Maier, Austrian Roman Catholic priest and blessed (b. 1908)
  - Takeichi Nishi, Japanese equestrian gold medalist (1932), tank commander at Battle of Iwo Jima (killed in action) (b. 1902)
- March 23 – Élisabeth de Rothschild, French WWII heroine (b. 1902)
- March 26
  - David Lloyd George, British politician and statesman, 51st Prime Minister of the United Kingdom (b. 1863)
  - Tadamichi Kuribayashi, Imperial Japanese Army general, commander of the battle of Iwo Jima (probably killed in action) (b. 1891)
  - Boris Shaposhnikov, Soviet military leader, Marshal of the Soviet Union (b. 1882)
  - Ichimaru Toshinosuke, Japanese naval aviator, commander at Battle of Iwo Jima (killed in action) (b. 1891)
- March 27 – Halid Ziya Uşaklıgil, Turkish author (b. 1867)
- March 29 – Ferenc Csik, Hungarian swimmer (air raid victim) (b. 1913)
- March 30 – Maurice Rose, American general (killed in action) (b. 1899)
- March 31
  - Hans Fischer, German chemist, Nobel Prize laureate (suicide) (b. 1881)
  - Torgny Segerstedt, Swedish newspaper editor, publicist (b. 1876)
  - Maria Skobtsova, Soviet Orthodox nun and saint (killed by poison) (b. 1891)
  - Natalia Tulasiewicz, Polish teacher and Roman Catholic blessed (murdered in concentration camp) (b. 1906)

=== April ===
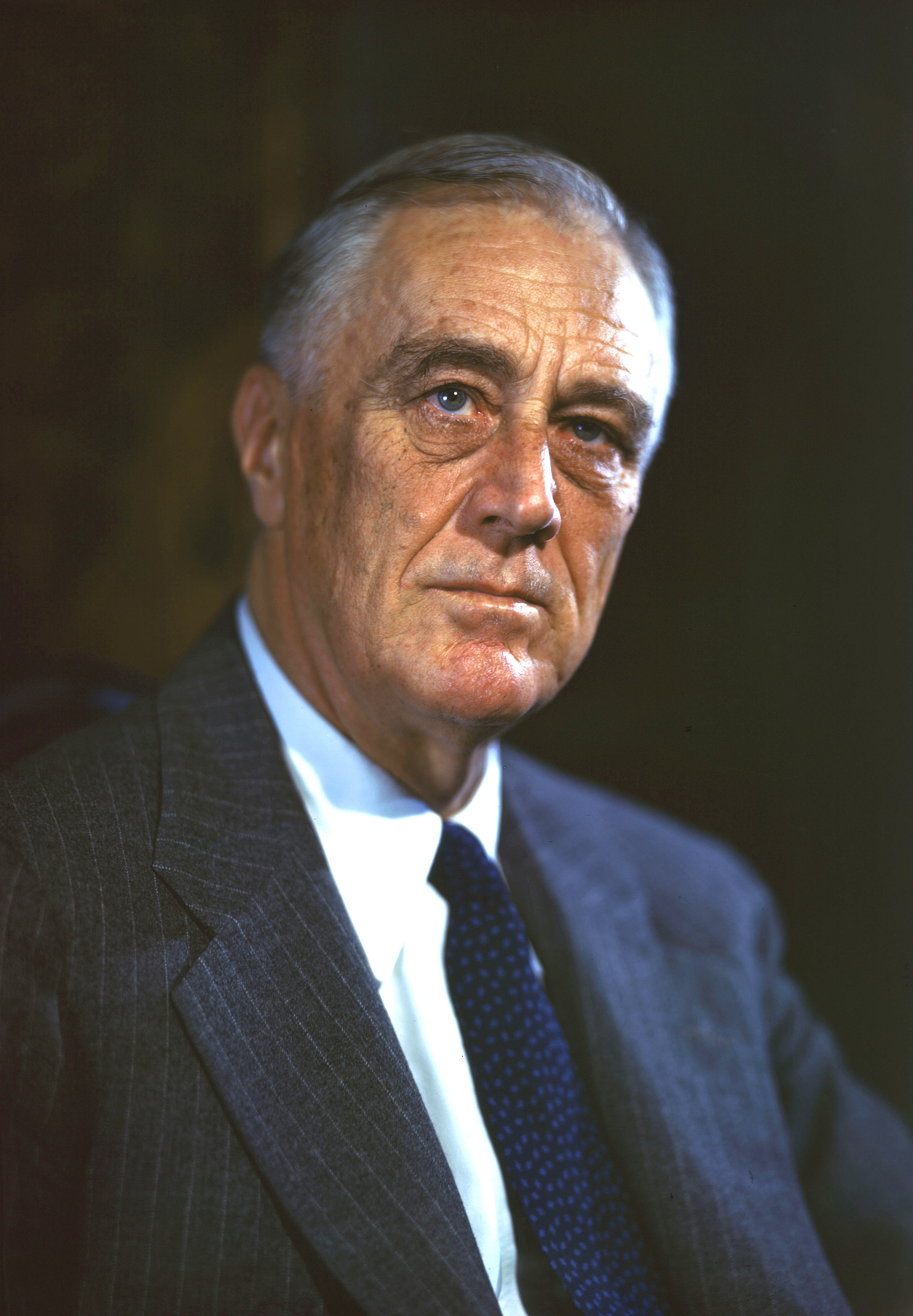
Franklin D. Roosevelt

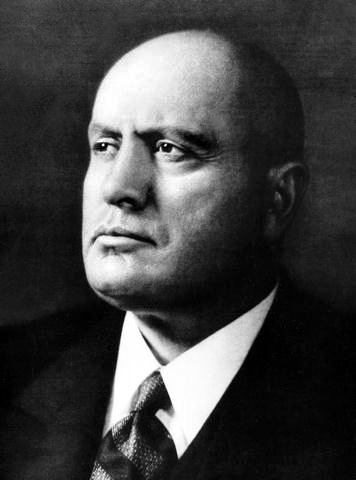
Benito Mussolini

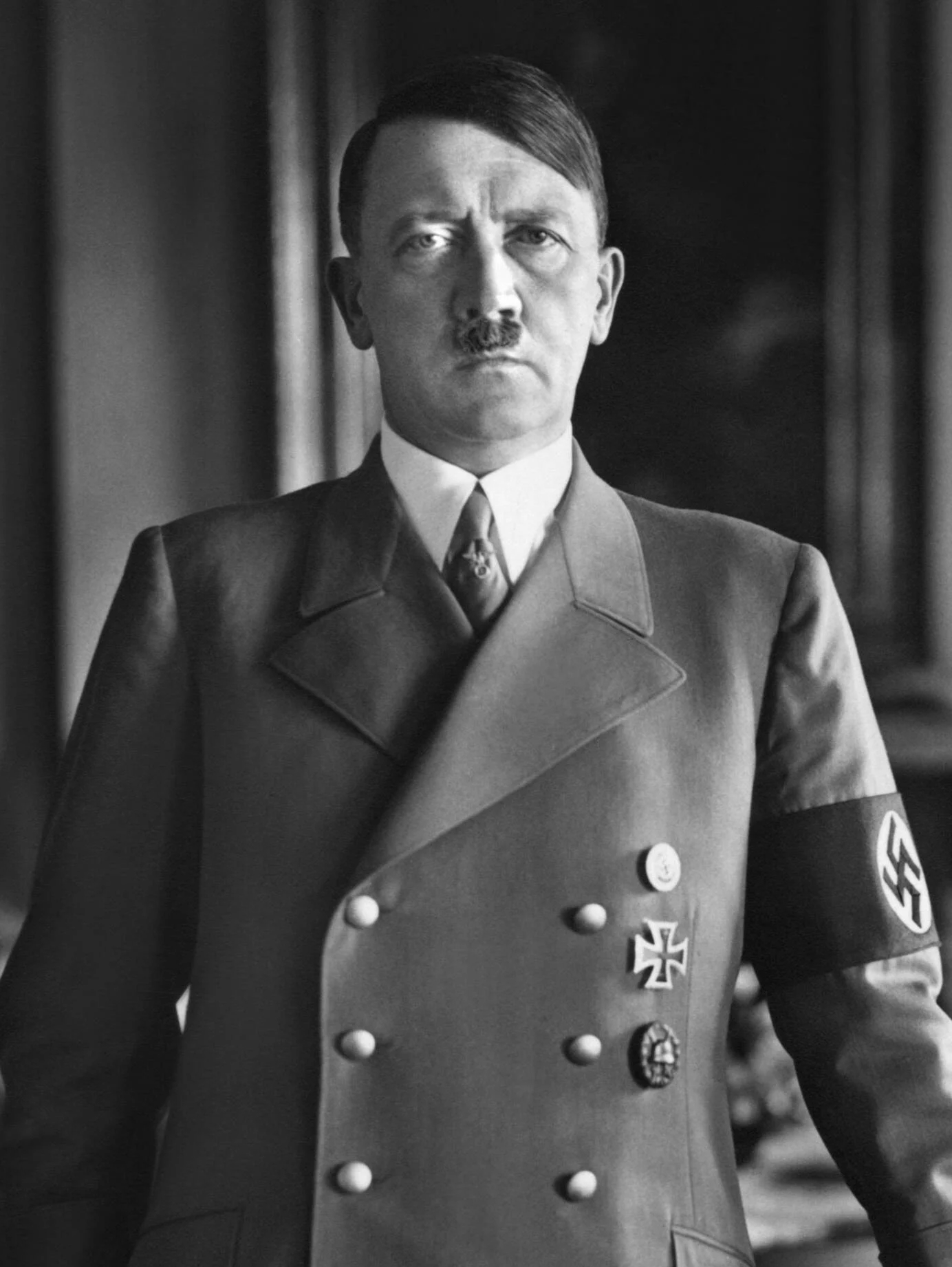
Adolf Hitler

- April 7
  - Seiichi Itō, Japanese admiral (lost in action) (b. 1890)
  - Aruga Kōsaku, Japanese admiral (lost in action) (b. 1897)
- April 9
  - Dietrich Bonhoeffer, German theologian (executed) (b. 1906)
  - Wilhelm Canaris, German admiral, head of the Abwehr (executed) (b. 1887)
  - Hans von Dohnanyi, Hungarian-born German lawyer, member of the German Resistance, 20 July Plotter (executed) (b. 1902)
  - Georg Elser, German carpenter and attempted assassin of Adolf Hitler (executed) (b. 1903)
- April 10
  - Gloria Dickson, American actress (fire victim) (b. 1917)
  - Hendrik Nicolaas Werkman, Dutch artist and printer (b. 1882)
- April 11 – Frederick Lugard, 1st Baron Lugard, British colonial administrator (b. 1858)
- April 12 – Franklin D. Roosevelt, American political leader and statesman, 32nd President of the United States (b. 1882)
- April 13 – Ernst Cassirer, German philosopher (b. 1874)
- April 15 – Joachim Albrecht Eggeling, German SS general (suicide) (b. 1884)
- April 18
  - Sir Ambrose Fleming, British electrical engineer and physicist (b. 1849)
  - Ernie Pyle, American journalist (killed in action) (b. 1900)
  - Wilhelm, Prince of Albania (b. 1876)
- April 21
  - Pavle Đurišić, Montenegrin Serb army commander (b. 1909)
  - Walter Model, German field marshal (suicide) (b. 1891)
- April 22 – Käthe Kollwitz, German artist (b. 1867)
- April 23 – Klaus Bonhoeffer, German resistance fighter, 20 July Plotter (executed) (b. 1901)
- April 24 – Ernst-Robert Grawitz, German SS Reichsphysician (suicide) (b. 1899)
- April 28
  - Executed:
    - Hermann Fegelein, German SS general (b. 1906)
    - Benito Mussolini, Italian politician, journalist, 27th Prime Minister of Italy and Duce of Fascism (b. 1883)
    - Clara Petacci, mistress of Benito Mussolini (b. 1912)
    - Nicola Bombacci, Italian Fascist politician (b. 1879)
    - Roberto Farinacci, Italian Fascist politician (b. 1892)
    - Alessandro Pavolini, Italian Fascist politician (b. 1903)
- April 29 – Achille Starace, Italian Fascist politician (executed) (b. 1889)
- April 30
  - Luisa Ferida, Italian actress (executed) (b. 1914)
  - Adolf Hitler, Austrian-born German politician, Führer of Germany (suicide) (b. 1889)
  - Eva Braun, wife of Adolf Hitler (suicide) (b. 1912)

=== May ===
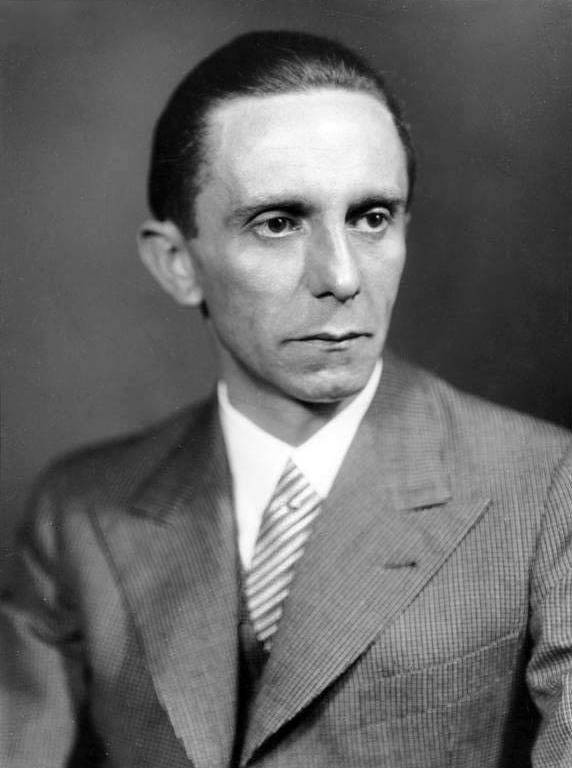
Joseph Goebbels

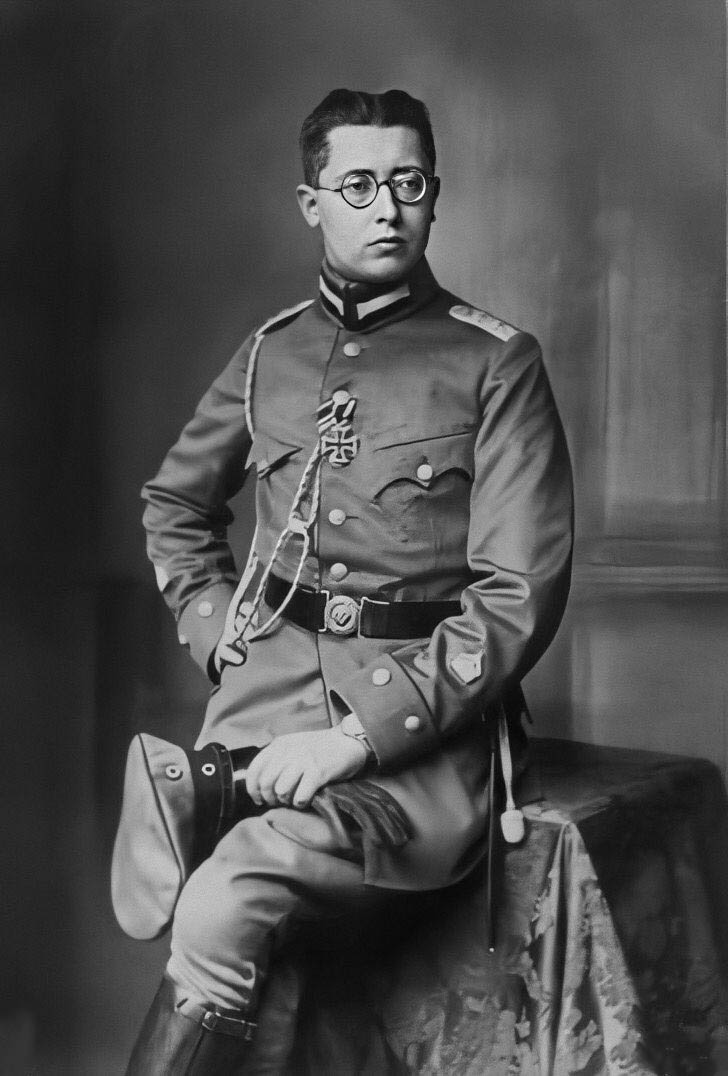
Prince Waldemar of Prussia

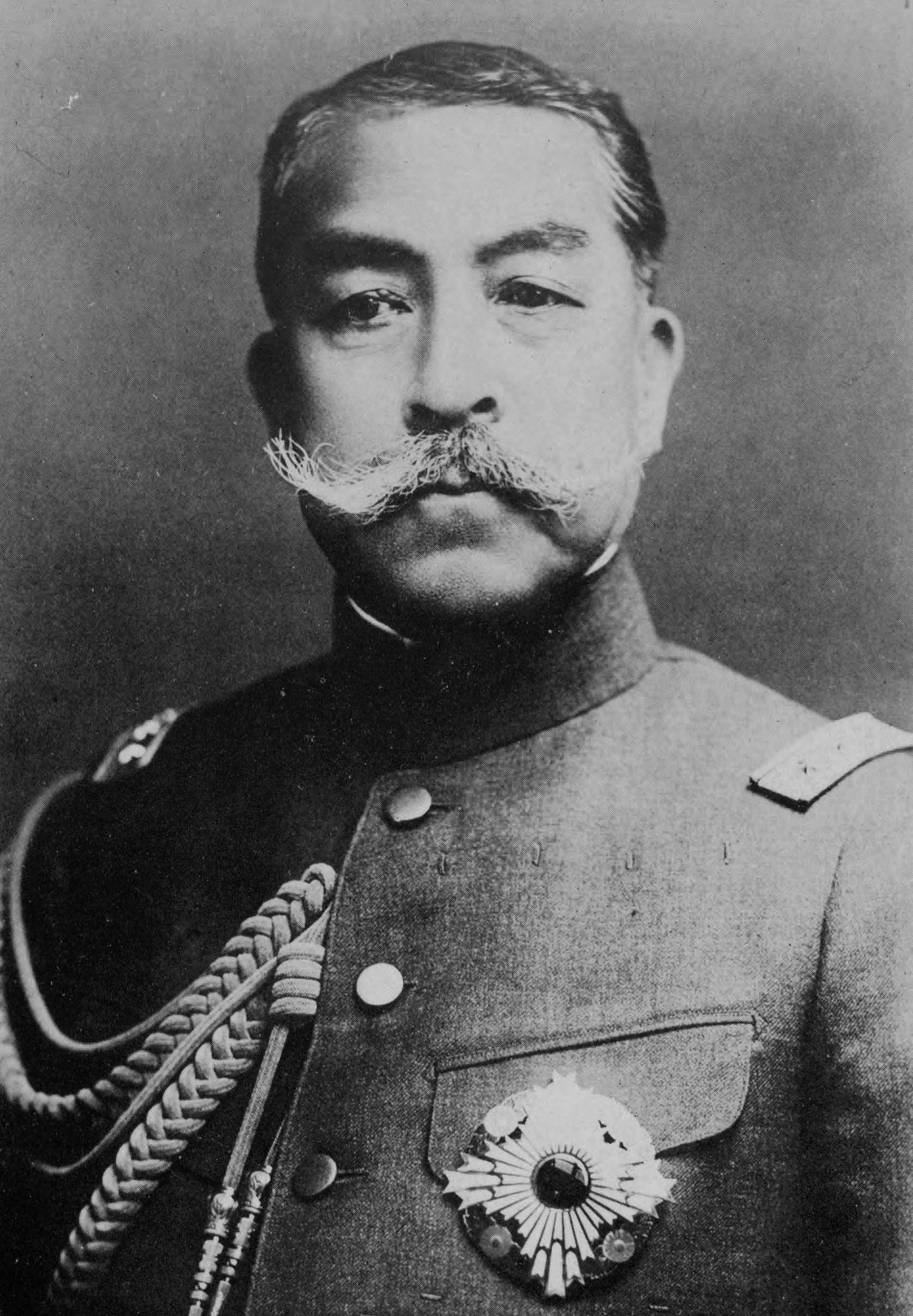
Prince Kan'in Kotohito

- May 1
  - Joseph Goebbels, Chancellor of Germany for 1 day and Reich Minister of Propaganda (suicide) (b. 1897)
  - Magda Goebbels, wife of Joseph Goebbels (suicide) (b. 1901)
- May 2
  - Martin Bormann, Nazi Party leader and private secretary to Adolf Hitler (presumed suicide) (b. 1900)
  - Wilhelm Burgdorf, German general (suicide) (b. 1895)
  - Hans Krebs, German general (suicide) (b. 1898)
  - Prince Waldemar of Prussia (haemophilia) (b. 1889)
- May 3 – Mario Blasich, Italian physician, politician (b. 1878)
- May 4 – Fedor von Bock, German field marshal (killed in action) (b. 1880)
- May 6 – Xhem Hasa, Albanian nationalist (assassinated) (b. 1908)
- May 7 – Vladimir Boyarsky, Soviet army officer (executed) (b. 1901)
- May 8
  - Francis Bruguière, American photographer (b. 1875)
  - Julius Hirsch, German footballer (killed in Auschwitz concentration camp) (b. 1892)
  - Wilhelm Rediess, SS and Police Leader of Nazi-occupied Norway (suicide) (b. 1900)
  - Bernhard Rust, education minister of Nazi Germany (presumed suicide) (b. 1883)
  - Josef Terboven, Reichskommissar of Nazi-occupied Norway (suicide) (b. 1898)
- May 9 – Gustav Becking, German musicologist (b. 1894)
- May 10 – Konrad Henlein, Sudeten German Nazi leader (suicide) (b. 1898)
- May 11
  - Kiyoshi Ogawa, Japanese kamikaze pilot (b. 1922)
  - Seizō Yasunori, Japanese kamikaze pilot (b. 1924)
- May 14
  - Joseph Barthélemy, French jurist, politician and journalist (b. 1874)
  - Heber J. Grant, 7th President of The Church of Jesus Christ of Latter-day Saints (b. 1856)
- May 15
  - Kenneth J. Alford, British soldier and composer (b. 1881)
  - Charles Williams, British author (b. 1886)
- May 16 – Kaju Sugiura, Japanese admiral (killed in action) (b. 1896)
- May 18 – William Joseph Simmons, American founder of the second Ku Klux Klan (b. 1880)
- May 19 – Philipp Bouhler, German Nazi leader and general (suicide) (b. 1899)
- May 21 – Prince Kan'in Kotohito, Japanese prince, member of the Imperial Japanese Army General Staff Office (b. 1865)
- May 23 – Heinrich Himmler, German politician, Reichsführer-SS (suicide) (b. 1900)
- May 24 – Robert Ritter von Greim, German field marshal (suicide) (b. 1892)
- May 25
  - Rafael Estrella Ureña, Dominican lawyer and politician, acting president of the Dominican Republic (b. 1889)
  - Ishii Kikujirō, Japanese diplomat and politician (killed in bombing raid) (b. 1866)
- May 31
  - Odilo Globocnik, Austrian Nazi leader (suicide) (b. 1904)
  - Curt von Gottberg, German SS general (suicide) (b. 1896)

=== June ===
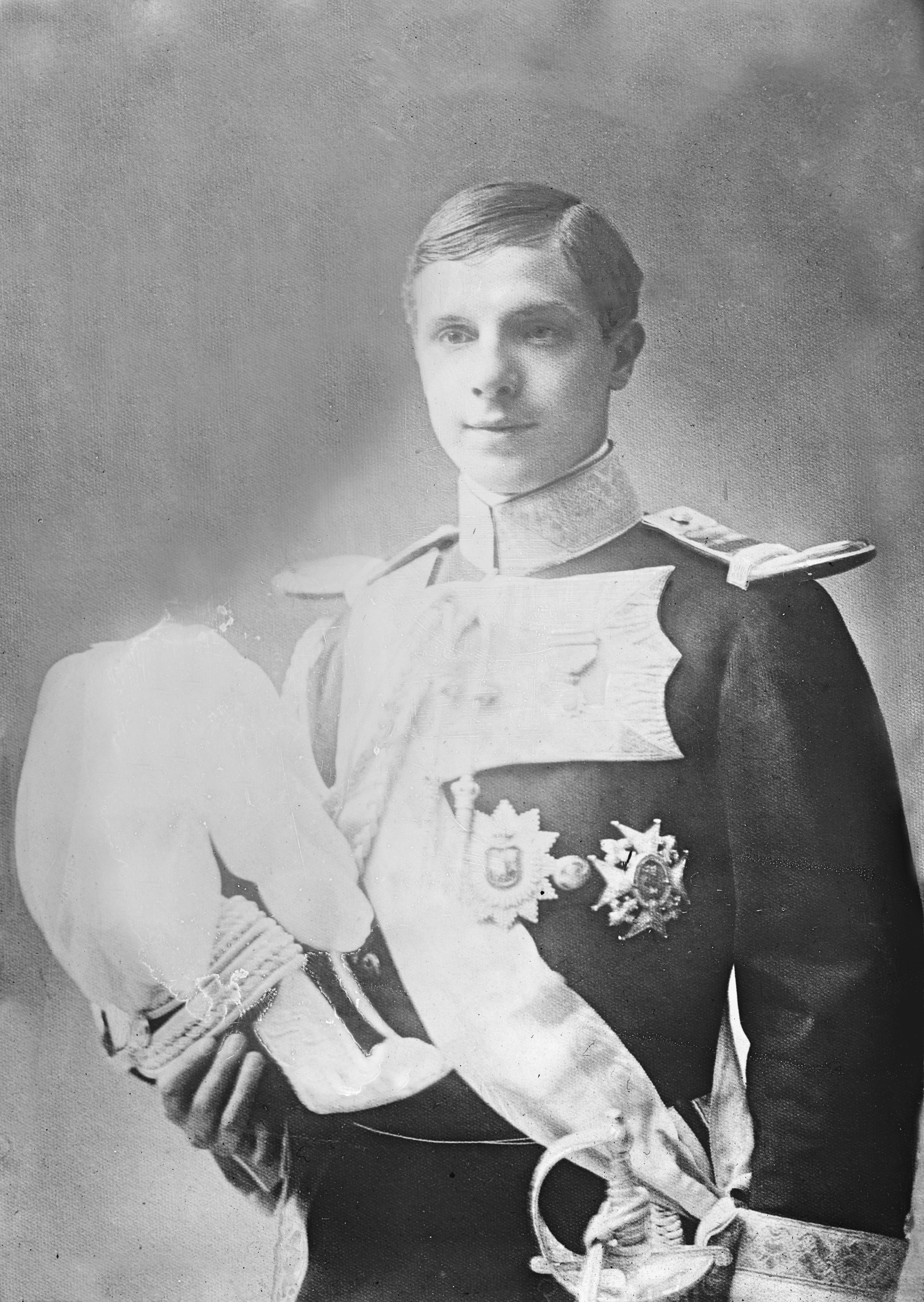
Luís Fernando de Orleans y Borbón

- June 4 – Georg Kaiser, German dramatist (b. 1878)
- June 7 – Kitaro Nishida, Japanese philosopher (b. 1870)
- June 8
  - Robert Desnos, French poet, resistance fighter (typhoid) (b. 1900)
  - Karl Hanke, German Nazi general and last Reichsführer-SS (killed) (b. 1903)
- June 11 – Lurana W. Sheldon, American author and editor (b. 1862)
- June 13 – Minoru Ōta, Japanese admiral (suicide) (b. 1891)
- June 15
  - Carl Gustaf Ekman, Prime Minister of Sweden (b. 1872)
  - Amélie Rives Troubetzkoy, American author (b. 1863)
  - Aris Velouchiotis, Greek World War II resistance leader (suicide) (b. 1905)
- June 16
  - Nikolai Berzarin, Soviet Red Army general (b. 1904)
  - Nils Edén, 15th Prime Minister of Sweden (b. 1871)
- June 18
  - Florence Bascom, American geologist and educator (b. 1862)
  - Simon Bolivar Buckner Jr., American general (killed in action on Okinawa) (b. 1886)
  - Friedrich, Prince of Wied, German prince (b. 1872)
- June 20
  - Robert Crewe-Milnes, 1st Marquess of Crewe, British politician (b. 1858)
  - Luís Fernando de Orleans y Borbón, Spanish prince (b. 1888)
- June 22
  - Isamu Chō, Japanese general (ritual suicide) (b. 1895)
  - Mitsuru Ushijima, Japanese general (ritual suicide) (b. 1887)
- June 24 – José Gutiérrez Solana, Spanish painter (b. 1886)
- June 27 – Emil Hácha, 3rd President of Czechoslovakia, State President of Protectorate of Bohemia and Moravia (b. 1872)
- June 30
  - Germogen (Maximov), Russian Orthodox Metropolitan (b. 1861)
  - Gabriel El-Registan, Soviet poet (b. 1899)

=== July ===
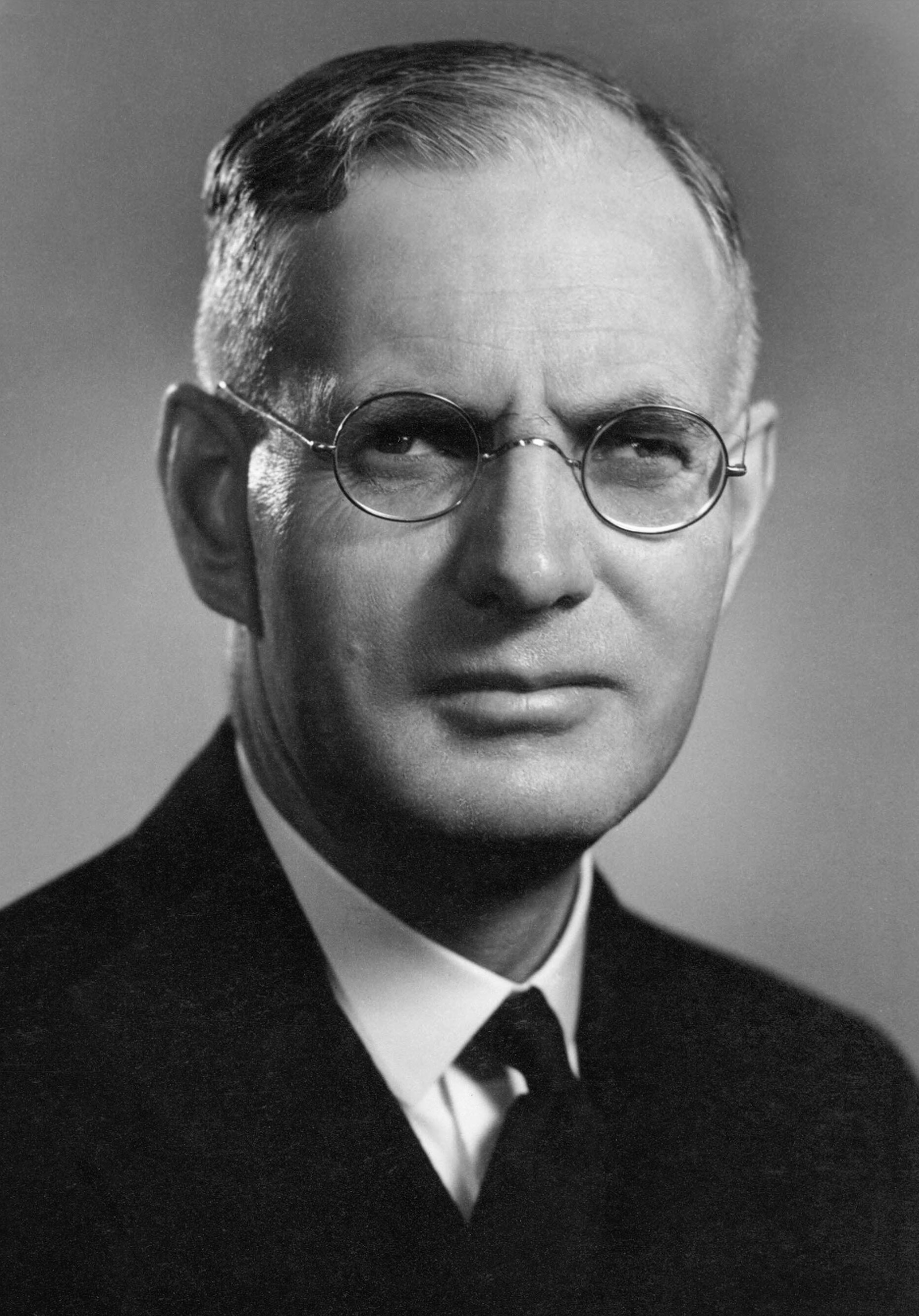
John Curtin

- July 1 – Félix Evaristo Mejía, Dominican diplomat, educator and writer (b. 1866)
- July 2 – Óscar R. Benavides, Peruvian field marshal, diplomat, politician and President of Peru (b. 1876)
- July 5 – John Curtin, 14th Prime Minister of Australia (b. 1885)
- July 7 – Peter To Rot, Papuan Roman Catholic layman, martyr and blessed (b. 1912)
- July 9 – Luigi Aldrovandi Marescotti, Italian politician, diplomat (b. 1876)
- July 12
  - Boris Galerkin, Russian mathematician (b. 1871)
  - Wolfram von Richthofen, German field marshal (brain tumor) (b. 1895)
- July 13 – Alla Nazimova, Russian-born American actress (b. 1879)
- July 17 – Ernst Busch, German field marshal, as prisoner of war (b. 1885)
- July 20 – Paul Valéry, French poet (b. 1871)
- July 24 – Arnold von Winckler, German general (b. 1856)
- July 25 – Malin Craig, United States Army general (b. 1875)
- July 28 – Margot Asquith, Countess of Oxford and Asquith (b. 1864)
- July 29 – Maria Pierina De Micheli, Italian Roman Catholic religious sister, mystic and blessed (b. 1890)
- July 31 – Artemio Ricarte, Filipino general (b. 1866)

=== August ===
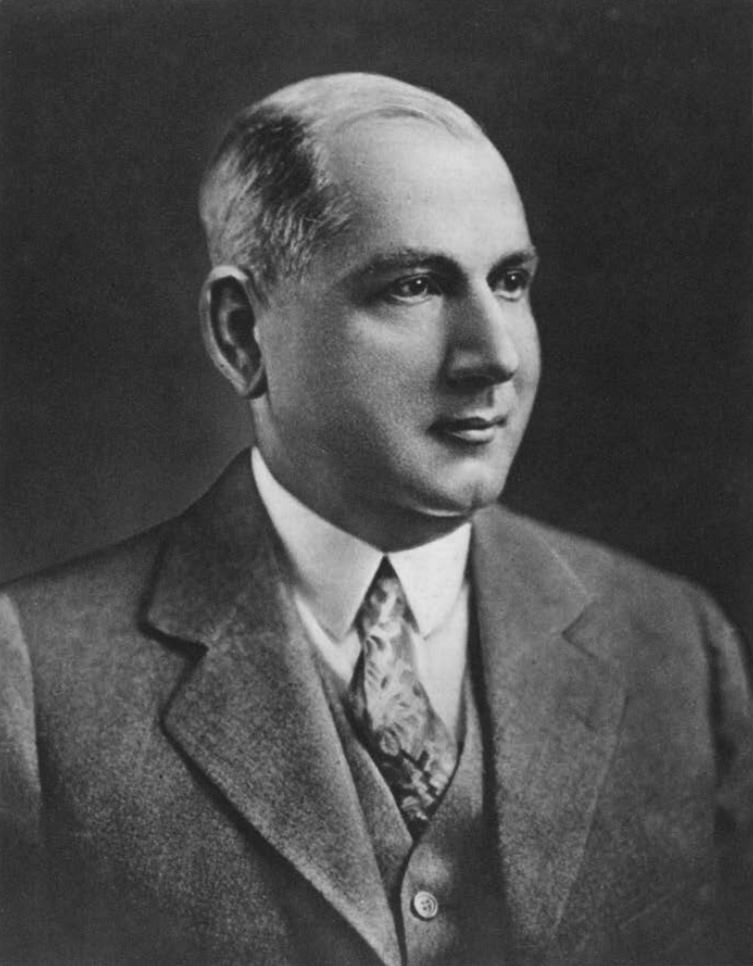
Florencio Harmodio Arosemena

- August 1 – Blas Cabrera Felipe, Spanish physicist (b. 1878)
- August 2 – Pietro Mascagni, Italian composer (b. 1863)
- August 3 – Roman Kochanowski, Polish painter, illustrator (b. 1857)
- August 4 – Gerhard Gentzen, German mathematician and logician (starvation in prison camp) (b. 1909)
- August 5 – Nat Jaffe, American swing jazz pianist (b. 1918)
- August 7 – Jacques Vaillant de Guélis, British/French WWII hero (injuries received in automobile accident) (b. 1907)
- August 8 – Joseph Pujol, Le Pétomane, French flatulist (b. 1857)
- August 9
  - Harry Hillman, American track athlete (b. 1881)
  - Jun Tosaka, Japanese philosopher (in prison) (b. 1900)
- August 10 – Robert H. Goddard, American rocket scientist (b. 1882)
- August 12 – Karl Leisner, German Roman Catholic priest and blessed (b. 1915)
- August 15
  - Korechika Anami, Japanese general (ritual suicide) (b. 1887)
  - Matome Ugaki, Japanese admiral (killed in action) (b. 1890)
- August 16 – Takijirō Ōnishi, Japanese admiral (ritual suicide) (b. 1891)
- August 18
  - Subhas Chandra Bose, Leader of Indian National Army (Third-degree burns from aircrash) (b. 1897)
  - Sarala Devi Chaudhurani, Indian educationist (b. 1872)
- August 24 – Shizuichi Tanaka, Japanese general (suicide) (b. 1887)
- August 25 – Willis Augustus Lee, American admiral, Olympic shooter (b. 1888)
- August 26
  - Princess Feodora of Saxe-Meiningen, German noblewoman (b. 1879)
  - Pio Collivadino, Argentinian painter (b. 1869)
  - Franz Werfel, Austrian writer (b. 1890)
- August 27 – Blessed María Pilar Izquierdo Albero, Spanish Roman Catholic religious professed (b. 1906)
- August 29 – Fritz Pfleumer, German engineer, inventor (b. 1881)
- August 30 – Florencio Harmodio Arosemena, 6th President of Panama (b. 1872)
- August 31
  - Stefan Banach, Polish mathematician (b. 1892)
  - Pope Macarius III of Alexandria, Egyptian patriarch, saint (b. 1872)

=== September ===
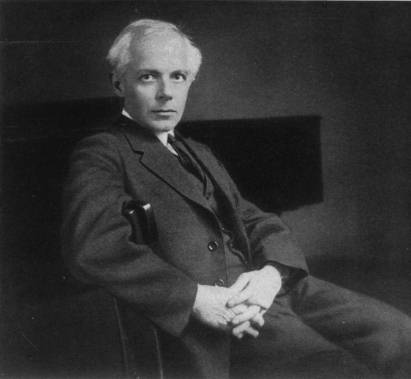
Béla Bartók

- September 6
  - Witold Leon Czartoryski, Polish nobleman (b. 1864)
  - John S. McCain Sr., American admiral (b. 1884)
- September 9 – Aage Bertelsen, Danish painter (b. 1873)
- September 12 – Hajime Sugiyama, Japanese general (suicide) (b. 1880)
- September 15
  - Richard Friedrich Johannes Pfeiffer, German physician and bacteriologist (b. 1858)
  - André Tardieu, 3-time prime minister of France (b. 1876)
  - Anton Webern, Austrian composer (b. 1883)
  - Zhang Mingqi, Qing dynasty politician (b. 1875)
- September 16 – John McCormack, Irish tenor (b. 1884)
- September 18
  - José Agripino Barnet, Cuban politician and diplomat, acting president of Cuba (b. 1864)
  - Blind Willie Johnson, American gospel blues singer (b. 1897)
- September 20
  - Augusto Tasso Fragoso, Brazilian soldier, statesman and interim president of Brazil (b. 1869)
  - Eduard Wirths, German doctor, chief SS doctor at Auschwitz concentration camp (suicide) (b. 1909)
- September 24 – Hans Geiger, German physicist, inventor (b. 1882)
- September 26
  - Béla Bartók, Hungarian composer (b. 1881)
  - Leonhard Kaupisch, German general (b. 1878)
  - Kiyoshi Miki, Japanese philosopher (b. 1897)

=== October ===
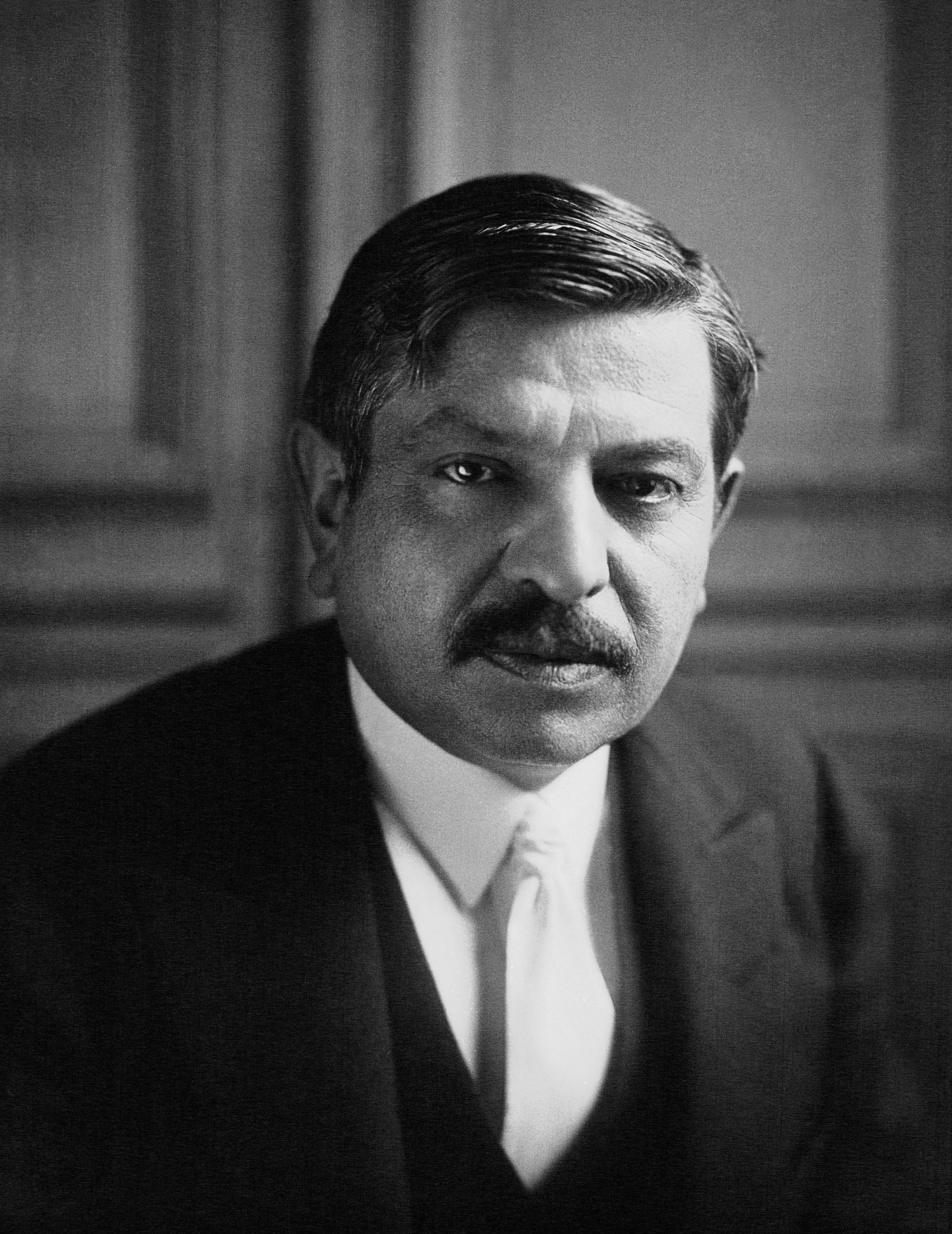
Pierre Laval

- October 1 – Walter Bradford Cannon, American physiologist (b. 1871)
- October 6 – Leonardo Conti, German physician, Nazi officer (suicide) (b. 1900)
- October 8 – Felix Salten, Austrian author (b. 1869)
- October 10 – Joseph Darnand, Vichy French politician (executed) (b. 1897)
- October 12 – Dmytro Antonovych, Soviet politician (b. 1877)
- October 13 – Milton S. Hershey, American chocolate tycoon (b. 1857)
- October 15 – Pierre Laval, French politician, 2-time Prime Minister of France (executed) (b. 1883)
- October 18 – Frederick Hovey, American tennis player (b. 1868)
- October 19
  - Plutarco Elías Calles, Mexican general, politician and 40th President of Mexico (b. 1877)
  - N. C. Wyeth, American illustrator (b. 1882)
- October 21
  - Henry Armetta, Italian actor (b. 1888)
  - Felicija Bortkevičienė, Lithuanian politician and publisher (b. 1873)
- October 24
  - Franklin Carmichael, Canadian landscape painter and graphic designer (b. 1890)
  - Vidkun Quisling, Norwegian Nazi collaborator (executed) (b. 1887)
- October 25 – Robert Ley, German Nazi politician (suicide) (b. 1890)
- October 26
  - Adolf von Brudermann, Austro-Hungarian general (b. 1854)
  - Paul Pelliot, French explorer (b. 1878)
- October 30 – Xian Xinghai, Chinese composer (b. 1905)
- October 31
  - Henry Ainley, British actor (b. 1879)
  - Ignacio Zuloaga, Basque Spanish painter (b. 1870)

=== November ===
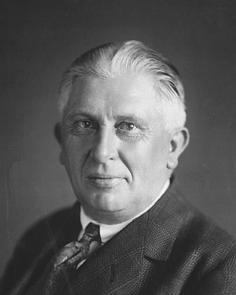
Sigurður Eggerz

- November 2 – Thora Chamberlain, American high school student (b. 1930)
- November 8 – August von Mackensen, German field marshal (b. 1849)
- November 11 – Jerome Kern, American composer (b. 1885)
- November 13 – Sir Edwyn Alexander-Sinclair, British admiral (b. 1865)
- November 16 – Sigurður Eggerz, Minister for Iceland during World War I and 2nd Prime Minister of Iceland (b. 1875)
- November 17 – Frederick Francis IV, Grand Duke of Mecklenburg-Schwerin (b. 1882)
- November 20 – Francis William Aston, British chemist, Nobel Prize laureate (b. 1877)
- November 21
  - Robert Benchley, American humorist, theater critic and actor (b. 1889)
  - Ellen Glasgow, American novelist (b. 1873)
  - Alexander Patch, United States Army lieutenant general, World War II army commander (b. 1889)
  - Jimmy Quinn, Scottish footballer (b. 1878)
- November 23 – Charles Coborn, British singer (b. 1852)
- November 24 – Gigō Funakoshi, Okinawan martial artist who, along with his father Gichin Funakoshi, developed the modern Shotokan style of karate. (tuberculosis) (b. 1906)
- November 27 – Josep Maria Sert, Spanish Catalan muralist (b. 1874)
- November 28 – Dwight F. Davis, American tennis player (b. 1879)
- November 30 – Shigeru Honjō, Japanese general (suicide) (b. 1876)

=== December ===
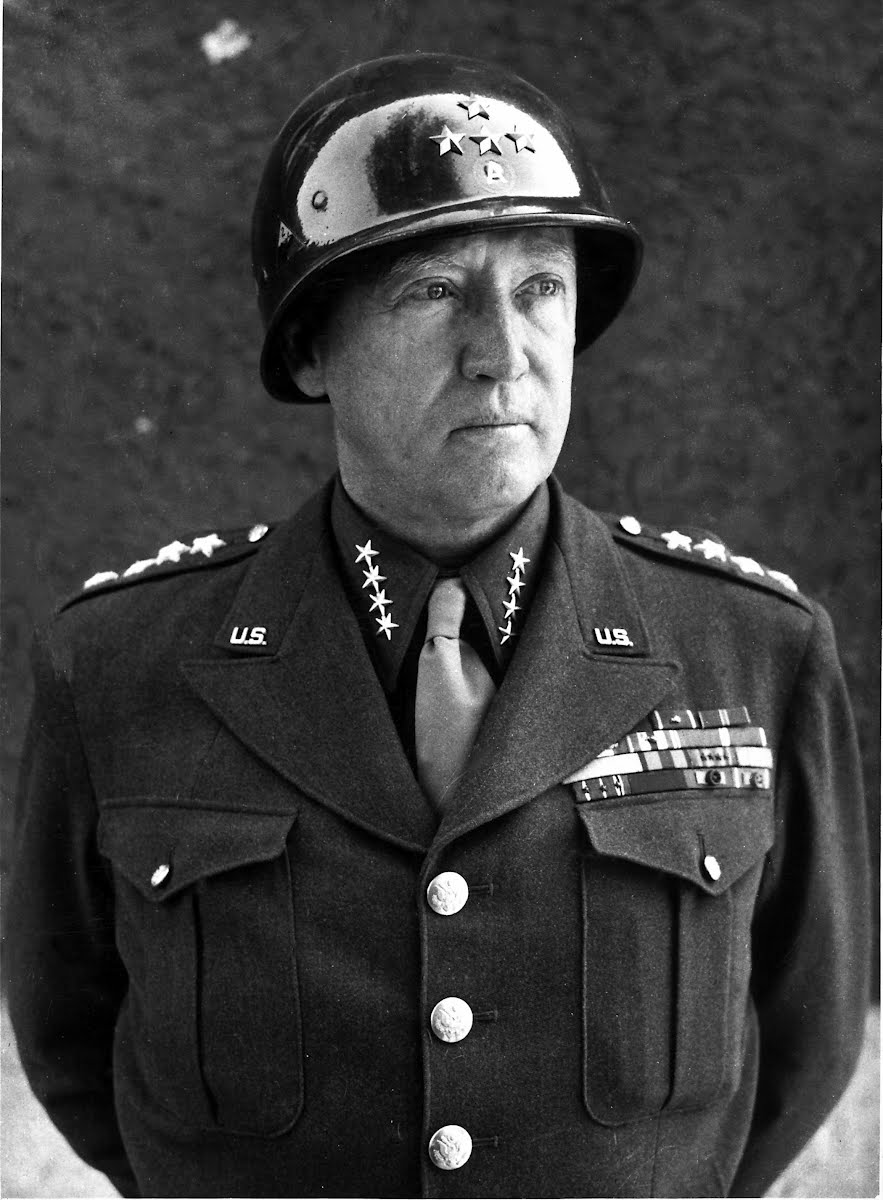
George S. Patton

- December 1 – Anton Dostler, German general (executed) (b. 1891)
- December 4
  - Thomas Hunt Morgan, American biologist, geneticist, embryologist and Nobel Prize in Physiology recipient (b. 1866)
  - Richárd Weisz, Hungarian Olympic champion wrestler (b. 1879)
- December 5 – Cosmo Gordon Lang, Archbishop of Canterbury (b. 1864)
- December 8 – Gabriellino D'Annunzio, Italian actor, director and screenwriter (b. 1886)
- December 12 – Prince Frederick of Schaumburg-Lippe (b. 1868)
- December 13
  - Johanna Bormann, German Nazi concentration camp guard (executed) (b. 1893)
  - Henri Dentz, French general (b. 1881)
  - Irma Grese, German camp guard at Bergen-Belsen concentration camp (executed) (b. 1923)
  - Josef Kramer, German commandant of Bergen-Belsen concentration camp (executed) (b. 1906)
  - Elisabeth Volkenrath, German supervisor at Nazi concentration camps (executed) (b. 1919)
- December 14 – Forrester Harvey, Irish actor (b. 1884)
- December 16
  - Giovanni Agnelli, Italian entrepreneur, founder of Fiat (b. 1866)
  - Fumimaro Konoe, Japanese general, politician, and 23rd Prime Minister of Japan (suicide) (b. 1891)
- December 19 – Leonard F. Wing, American general and politician (b. 1893)
- December 21 – George S. Patton, American general (injuries from automobile accident) (b. 1885)
- December 22 – Otto Neurath, Austrian philosopher, political economist (b. 1892)
- December 25 – Joseph Wilson Ervin, United States House of Representatives from North Carolina (b. 1901)
- December 26
  - Duy Tân, Emperor of Vietnam (b. 1900)
  - Roger Keyes, 1st Baron Keyes, British admiral (b. 1872)
- December 28 – Theodore Dreiser, American novelist (b. 1871)

== Nobel Prizes ==

- Physics – Wolfgang Pauli
- Chemistry – Artturi Ilmari Virtanen
- Physiology or Medicine – Sir Alexander Fleming, Ernst Chain, Howard Florey
- Literature – Gabriela Mistral
- Peace – Cordell Hull
