= Bonsergent =

Bonsergent is a surname. Notable people with the surname include:

- Jacques Bonsergent (died 1940), French engineer
- Stéphane Bonsergent (born 1977), French racing cyclist
