= Jacques Bonsergent =

French engineer

Jacques Bonsergent

Jacques Bonsergent was a French engineer who was executed by firing squad on 23 December 1940, age 28. Bonsergent's execution has been described as the first execution of a French civilian in the German occupation of France in World War II.

Born on September 14, 1912, in Missiriac, France, Jacques Marie Georges Bonsergent was the son of Gabrielle Emilie Caroline (née Bato) and Charles Louis Désiré Bonsergent. He was trained at the Arts et Métiers ParisTech engineering school and was part of the Gadzarts alumni community.

On 10 November 1940, a scuffle on the Rue du Havre in Paris occurred between some civilian residents and German soldiers, which ended with a civilian raising his fist to a German sergeant. This incident somehow resulted in Bonsergent's arrest by German officials, despite only being a witness to the altercation.

On 5 December 1940, Bonsergent was convicted by a German military court of insulting the Wehrmacht. He insisted on taking full responsibility, saying he wanted to show the French what sort of people the Germans were. Bonsergent was executed on 23 December 1940.

The arrest and execution of Bonsergent, a man guilty only of being a witness to an incident that was in itself only very trivial, brought home to many of the French the precise nature of the "New Order in Europe". All over Paris, posters placed by German authorities warned that all who challenged the might of the Reich would meet Bonsergent's fate. The writer Jean Bruller remembered being "transfixed" by reading about Bonsergent's fate and how "people stopped, read, wordlessly exchanged glances. Some of them bared their heads as if in the presence of the dead". Many of these posters were torn down or vandalized in protest, despite the declaration from General Otto von Stülpnagel that damaging the posters was an act of sabotage that would be punished by the death penalty. In fact, so many posters were disturbed that Stülpnagel had to post policemen to guard them.

On Christmas Day 1940, Parisians woke to find that in the previous night, the posters announcing Bonsergent's execution had been turned into shrines, being in Bruller's words "surrounded by flowers, like on so many tombs. Little flowers of every kind, mounted on pins, had been struck on the posters during the night-real flowers and artificial ones, paper pansies, celluloid roses, small French and British flags". The writer Simone de Beauvoir stated that it was not just Bonsergent that people mourned, but also the end of the illusion "as for the first time these correct people who occupied our country were officially telling us they had executed a Frenchman guilty of not bowing his head to them".

A station of the Paris Métro (Station Jacques Bonsergent) and a Parisian city plaza, Place Jacques-Bonsergent, were named after him to honour his memory.
