= List of Arts et Métiers ParisTech alumni =

This is a list of notable people affiliated with the Arts et Métiers ParisTech. Alumni of the Arts et Métiers ParisTech are traditionally called Gadzarts.

== Famous Gadzarts by field ==
"NH Prize" means that the person was awarded the Nessim Habif Prize. There at least two other prizes called Nessim Habif, from Académie royale de langue et de littérature françaises de Belgique and University of Geneva. Nessim Habif was born in Turkey. He was trained as an Arts et Métiers engineer, in Lille, and graduated in 1903, with a successful career in the Egyptian sugar industry.

== Armament industry ==
- Désiré Legat - Châlons, 1853: production of guns
- Ingénieur Robin - Châlons, 1867: created the modern 75mm gun shell
- Albert Oberhauser - Châlons, 1890: achieved the mass production of 100,000 rockets a day

=== Automotive industry ===
- Émile Delahaye - Angers, 1859: first to use pumps for water circulation
- Charles Trépardoux - Angers, 1868: first steam tricycle
- Charles Brasier - Châlons, 1880: car with stiff frame and effective shock absorbers
- Louis Delâge - Angers, 1890: luxury car maker
- Louis Coatalen - Cluny, 1895: contributed to the famous "Liberty" engine that equipped the US Army trucks during World War I
- Sébastien Iglesis - Aix, 1896
- Henri Perrot - Châlons, 1899
- François Castaing - Paris, 1964: recognized as a visionary change agent who helped transform the automotive industry

=== Aviation ===
- Alexandre Goupil - Angers, 1859: first helix for airplanes
- Lucien Chauvière - Angers, 1891: known for aircraft propeller designs
- Charles Cormont - Angers, 1895: built 40 dirigible balloons
- Louis Béchereau - Angers, 1896: first airplane to reaches a speed of 200 km/h; creator of the famous World War I SPAD air fighter (Guynemer's Vieux Charles), 13,000 of which were built
- Léon Lemartin - Aix-en-Provence, 1902: co-designer of the Gnome Omega rotary aero-engine, pioneer aviator for Bleriot, world record holder
- Antoine Odier - Aix, 1909: created the Odier Vendôme biplane and constructed a twin-engined seaplane with ballcocks
- René Couzinet - Angers, 1921: built his famous Arc-en-Ciel, which flew Paris to Buenos-Aires in 2 days and 15 hours
- Pierre Nadot - Paris, 1924: first flight of the Caravelle
- Georges Gutman - Cluny, 1943: creator of the EROS oxygen mask for civil aviation; inventor of a pneumatic harness for the fast use of the mask in flight; Nessim Habif Prize
- Jean Pinet - Angers, 1946: first person to take Concorde supersonic

=== Railway ===
- Jean-Jacques Meyer - Châlons, 1823: a variable relaxation system for steam engines
- Alexandre Desroches - Angers, 1829: railway in Russia
- Edmond Roy - Angers, 1837: railway of the Andes
- Nicole Laroche (née Schrottenloher) - Lille, 1964: first female Gadzarts, worked on railway carriage air conditioning.
- François Michel - Châlons, 1847: built the first sleepers, in Moscow, for the Saint Petersburg-Moscow line
- Raymond Garde - Paris, 1939: one of the fathers of the High Speed Train (TGV)

=== Printing Industry ===
- Charles Catala - Châlons, 1839: Manufacture of straw paper mass
- Joseph Heusse - Châlons, 1842: enhancements of printing machines
- Abel Boisseau - Angers, 1856: with Marioni, he created the rotary presses
- Louis Moyroud - Cluny, 1933: Nessim Habif Prize; with René Higonet, he invented the automatic photocomposition, in 1944; member of the American National Inventor Hall of Fame

=== Navy ===
- Claude Goubet - Angers, 1843: first French submarine
- Charles Marzari - Châlons, 1861 and Albert Dufont - Châlons, 1865: navy turrets
- Joseph Barguillet - Angers, 1862: the first of a long line of Arts & Métiers general mechanics engineer; ranked as an admiral
- Jules Tessier - some other person than the Canadian lawyer Jules Tessier - Angers, 1887: warships, the Gerfaut, the Terrible, world speed records

=== Mechanics - electricity ===
- Henri Flaud - Angers 1830: fire pumps
- Émile Lecoq - Châlons, 1839: specialist of printing and numbering machines
- Lucien Arbel - Aix, 1843: metallurgy, machines
- Amédée Buquet - Angers 1846: excavators for hard stones
- Ignace Schabaver - Châlons, 1850: centrifugal pumps (see also Le Rialet)
- Léandre Megy - Aix, 1851: lifting and handling, brakes
- Émile Cail - Châlons, 1855: founded the Fives-Lille company
- Eugène Daguin - Châlons, 1865: the Daguin stamping machine
- René Guillery - Châlons, 1883: production control machines
- Alphonse Pégard - Châlons, 1885: production machines
- Claude Gambin - Châlons, 1900: milling machines
- Henri Bruet - Lille, 1904: Cazeneuve lathes
- Marius Lavet - Cluny, 1910: NH Prize; electric and electronic clocks (quartz watches)
- Jean Dutheil - Aix, 1916: NH Prize; advanced techniques for metal made buildings
- Pierre Bézier - Paris, 1927: NH Prize; machine tools for mass production (robots); inventor of computer aided design and Bézier curve
- Raymond Pailloux - Châlons, 1927: developed the integrated circuit technique
- Marcel Sédille - Paris, 1928: gas and steam turbines
- Georges Henriot - Lille, 1938: kinematics of the gears

=== Textile industry ===
- Frédéric Quinson - Aix, 1847: invented a woolcombing machine for silk scrap

=== Public infrastructures industry ===
- Jean-Baptiste Monnier - Châlons, 1828: first sugar plant in the Nile valley
- François Barbarin - Angers, 1844: Bizerte and Tabarka harbours, Gaza phosphates
- Henri Diedrich - Angers, 1844: phosphates plant in Krourigba
- Dominique Berjeaut - Aix, 1844: Danube navigation
- Amédée Buquet - Angers, 1846: mechanical excavator for hard stone boring
- Alponse Pellerin - Châlons, 1849 and Louis Pellerin - Angers, 1875: bridges, tunnels, deep water foundations
- Ernest Fouquet - Châlons, 1849: Trotzki Bridge on the Neva River in Petrograd
- Louis Bret - Angers, 1852: viaducts in Cratellauk, Fiaccati
- Vincent Dauzats - Angers, 1856: Suez, Panama and Corinth canals
- Félix Faraud - Aix, 1862: close counselor of the Cambodia king, discovered many Khmer people monuments
- Alfred Letort - Châlons, 1868: sugar plants, refineries in Egypt
- Ernest Laigle - Châlons, 1871: Mexico City, Vera-Cruz bridge
- Louis Viriot - Châlons, 1872: Tunis, Sousse and Sfax harbours
- Léon Chagnaud - Châlons, 1881: subway under the Seine River, Rove tunnel, Eguzon stopping, Donzère-Mondragon plant
- Charles Vieille - Châlons, 1912: water stopping on the Niger River in Sansanding
- Nicolas Esquillan - Châlons, 1919: NH Prize; arch of the CNIT building, Tancarville Bridge, reinforced concrete in thin shells
- Jean Roret - Paris, 1942: Saint-Nazaire, Nantes, Rouen and Sèvres bridges, Eiffel Tower handing-over to the standards, building of the Maine-Montparnasse tower
- Henri Delauze - Aix, 1946: Nessim Habif Prize; very deep sea diving; founder and CEO of the Comex company

== Miscellaneous (sorted by center of origin) ==
=== Compiègne ===
- Joseph Meifred - Compiègne-Châlons-en-Champagne, 1801: cornist, pedagogue, horn designer; studied at the Paris Conservatory; based the Society of Arts et Métiers alumni in 1846

=== Aix-en-Provence ===
- Henri Jus - Aix, 1847: geologist, master in the art of probing the ground; dedicated 44 years of his life to transforming the Sahara desert; by doing this, he saved the Oued Rihr oasis and created around 500 water sources, yielding a total of 250 000 m^{3}/min; created many oases; named "ßou el Ma » (the father of water) by the Saharan people
- Henri Verneuil - Aix, 1940: Nessim Habif Prize; French film maker

=== Angers ===
- Jacques Bonsergent - Angers, 1930: accidentally involved in a scuffle with German soldiers in 1940; arrested by mistake, he refused to denounce his companions; sentenced to death by a German military tribunal and became the first shot person in Paris, on December 23, 1940 at age 28; his name was given to a subway station in Paris in 1946

=== Châlons-en-Champagne ===
- Eugène Houdry - Châlons, 1908: dedicated his life to the development of oil processing techniques; invented several new processes and created 14 big catalytic cracking units; files more than 600 patents; thanks to the higher energetic power of his gasoline, Allied war planes proved superior to their opponents during World War II

=== Cluny ===
- Pierre Angénieux - Cluny, 1925: NH Prize; high quality camera and cinema lenses; built cameras for space flights; awarded the Gordon E. Sawyer Award
