= Carnot Institute ARTS =

French research institute

Actions for Research, Technology and Society
- Actions de Recherche pour la Technologie et la Société
- Established: 2006
- Research type: Fundamental and applied research
- Budget: 82 M€
- Field of research: mechanics, electronics, material sciences, virtual reality, process
- Director: Frédéric Merienne
- Faculty: 300
- Staff: 1250
- Students: 250
- Location: Lille, Bordeaux, Metz, Paris, Aix-en-Provence, Cluny, Angers, Châlons-en-Champagne, France; 48.834066°N 2.357453°E
- Campus: 8 campuses of Arts et Métiers ParisTech
- CNRS: 9 CNRS unities of research
- Affiliations: Arts et Métiers ParisTech; CNRS
- Website: https://www.ic-arts.eu

The Carnot Institute ARTS (Actions for Research, Technology and Society; French: Actions de Recherche pour la Technologie et la Société, English: /kɑːrˈnoʊ/ kar-NOH) is a French research institute. It was originally created to group the 15 laboratories of the engineering school Arts et Métiers ParisTech. It received the Carnot label in 2006.

== Creation ==
ARTS was among the first 20 institutes to be certified by the French Minister of higher education and research.

== Laboratories ==
The laboratories are spread in the 8 centers of teaching and research of Arts et Métiers ParisTech. Some of them have satellite facilities in the 3 institutes of research of Arts et Métiers ParisTech and in the buildings of research partners like CNAM or école navale.

=== Departments ===
The laboratories are organized in 3 departments:

- Design, Industrialization, Risk, Decision (CIRD)
- Mechanics, Materials, Processes (M2P)
- Fluids and Energy (FISE)

=== Labs by locations ===
The list of the laboratories grouped by main locations :

- Île-de-France
  - Laboratory of fluid dynamics (DynFluid)
  - Laboratory of biomechanics (LBM)
  - Laboratory of product design and innovation (LCPI)
  - Laboratory of process, mechanical and material engineering (PIMM)
  - Institute of aerotechnics (IAT)
  - Paris Design Lab (PDL)
  - Properties and architectures of alloys and mixes (P2AM)
  - LAboratory of energy process, environment and health (LGP2ES)
- Lille
  - Lille Laboratory of Mechanics (LML)
  - Lille Laboratory of Electrical Engineering and Power Electronics (L2EP)
  - Thermodynamics, flows, mechanics, material sciences, forming, manufacturing (TEMPO)
- Cluny
  - Burgundy laboratory of material sciences and process (LaBoMaP)
  - Laboratory of electronics and digital imaging (LE2I)
  - Team of technological research and development (ERDT)
  - Interdisciplinary Carnot laboratory of burgundy (ICB)
  - Team of research material-process (ERMPV)
- Angers
  - Arts et Métiers ParisTech laboratory of Angers (LAMPA)
- Aix-en-Provence
  - Laboratory of IT and systems (LSIS-INSM)
- Bordeaux
  - Institute of mechanics and engineering (I2M)
- Metz
  - Laboratory of Microstructure Studies and Mechanics of Materials (LEM3)
  - Laboratory of design, manufacturing and control (LCFC)
- Châlons-en-Champagne
  - Laboratory of mechanics, surface, material sciences and process (MSMP)

== Contracts ==
The contracts with private companies or with ANR (National agency for research) raised up to 12 million euros each year.
