= LBMS =

LBMS may refer to:

- La Belle Montessori School, Silang, Cavite, Philippines
- Laboratory for Bioregenerative Medicine and Surgery, Weill Cornell Medical College, New York, New York, U.S.
- Lake Bluff Middle School, Lake Bluff, Illinois, U.S.
- Liberty Bowl Memorial Stadium, Memphis, Tennessee, U.S.
- Low-back-merger shift, a phenomenon in North American English phonetics
- Luther Burbank Middle School (disambiguation), several schools

== See also ==
- LBM (disambiguation)
