= Noémie Elhadad =

American data scientist and academic

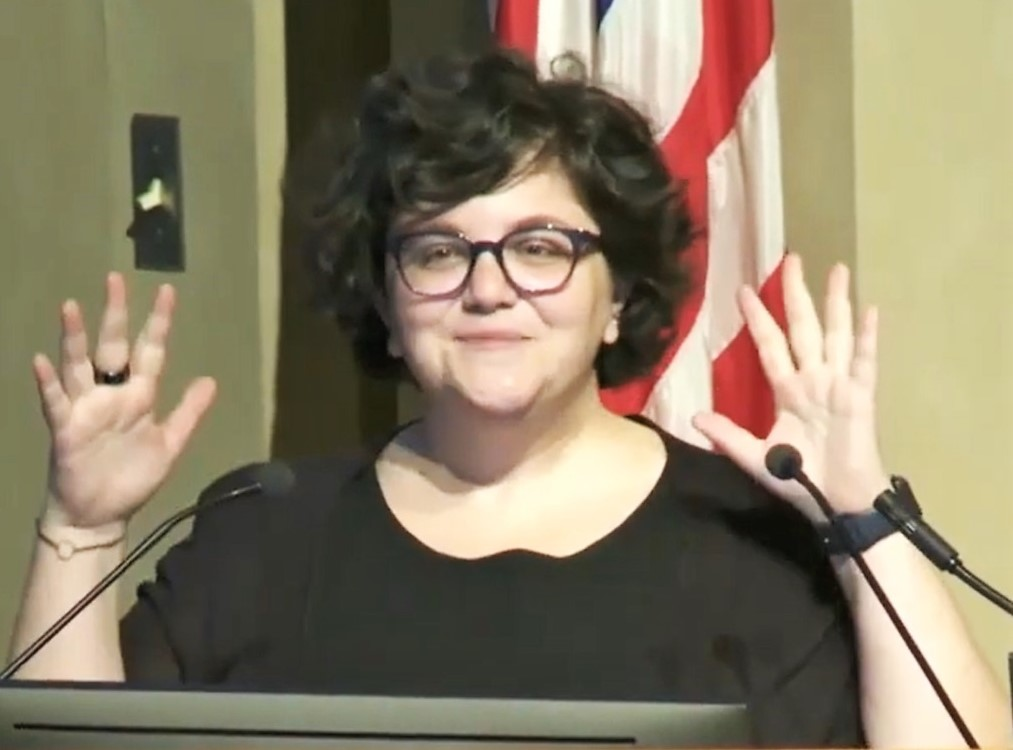
- Elhadad speaks at the National Library of Medicine in 2019
- Education: Columbia University; ENSEIRB-MATMECA
- Scientific career
- Workplaces: Columbia University; City College of New York; City University of New York
- Thesis: User-sensitive text summarization : application to the medical domain (2006)

Noémie Elhadad is an American data scientist who is an associate professor of biomedical informatics at the Columbia University Vagelos College of Physicians and Surgeons. As of 2022, she serves as the chair of the Department of Biomedical Informatics. Her research considers machine learning in bioinformatics, natural language processing and medicine.

== Early life and education ==
Elhadad studied computer software engineering at École nationale supérieure d'électronique, informatique, télécommunications, mathématique et mécanique de Bordeaux (ENSEIRB). She completed her doctoral research at Columbia University. She was based in the Department of Computer Science, where she developed patient-focused text summaries of clinical literature.

== Research and career ==
Elhadad joined the faculty at the City College of New York. In 2007 she joined the Department of Biomedical Informatics at Columbia University. She was made Chair of the Health Analytics Center at the Columbia Data Science Institute in 2013. Her research considers how clinical data, electronic health records and patient-generated data can enhance access to information for researchers, patients and physicians. She developed an artificial intelligence tool that supported patients in the NewYork-Presbyterian Hospital.

Elhadad is interested in using data to advance women's health. She led the Citizen Endo Project that looks to comprehensively describe how patients experience endometriosis. It was built using principles of citizen science, using patient testimonials from focus groups in New York City and data aggregation. She created the app, Phendo, which asks patients about their experience of the disease. The name Phendo is a portmanteau of phenotyping endometriosis.

Elhadad was announced as chair of the Department of Biomedical Informatics in December 2022.

== Selected publications ==
- Caruana, Rich; Lou, Yin; Gehrke, Johannes; Koch, Paul; Sturm, Marc; Elhadad, Noemie (August 10, 2015). "Intelligible Models for HealthCare". Proceedings of the 21th ACM SIGKDD International Conference on Knowledge Discovery and Data Mining. New York, NY, USA: ACM. pp. 1721–1730. doi:10.1145/2783258.2788613. ISBN 9781450336642. S2CID 14190268.
- Chaitanya Shivade; Preethi Raghavan; Eric Fosler-Lussier; Peter J Embi; Noemie Elhadad; Stephen B Johnson; Albert M Lai (2013). "A review of approaches to identifying patient phenotype cohorts using electronic health records". Journal of the American Medical Informatics Association. 21 (2): 221–230. doi:10.1136/amiajnl-2013-001935. PMC 3932460. PMID 24201027. Wikidata Q37598951.
- Shivade, Chaitanya; Raghavan, Preethi; Fosler-Lussier, Eric; Embi, Peter J; Elhadad, Noemie; Johnson, Stephen B; Lai, Albert M (March 2014). "A review of approaches to identifying patient phenotype cohorts using electronic health records". Journal of the American Medical Informatics Association. 21 (2): 221–230. doi:10.1136/amiajnl-2013-001935. ISSN 1067-5027. PMC 3932460. PMID 24201027.

== Personal life ==
Elhadad suffers from endometriosis.
