= Laboratory of design, manufacturing and control =

French research laboratory

LCFC
- Laboratory of design, manufacturing and control
- Latin: Laboratoire de conception fabrication commande
- Established: 2009
- Research type: applied research
- Field of research: mechanics, Electronics, manufacturing
- Director: Régis Bigot
- Faculty: 13
- Students: 20
- Location: Metz, 57070, France; 49.09407°N 6.22618°E
- Campus: Metz Science Park
- CNRS: EA CNRS 4495
- Affiliations: Arts et Métiers ParisTech
- Website: http://arquivo.pt/wayback/20141127112915/http%3A//www.lcfc.fr/wordpress/

The Laboratory of design, manufacturing and control (in French: Laboratoire de conception fabrication commande), also known as the LCFC, is a French laboratory of research located in Metz. It is under the authority of Arts et Métiers ParisTech. It is part of the Carnot Institute ARTS and currently employs more than 30 persons. It was created in 2009 from the division of the LGIPM, a laboratory specialized in industrial design and manufacturing. It is also part of the doctoral school 432 of Arts et Métiers ParisTech.

== Teaching and research topics ==
The main part of the research is focused on the following lines:

- Control of complex robots
- Development of innovative processes and manufacturing methods
- Methods for decision taking and design

== Projects ==
Since 2012, the LCFC is part of the project BioCapTech and contribute to the design of new water treatment systems. The joint venture with the Agence nationale de la recherche aims to design a new humanoid robot, nicknamed Hydroid. The laboratory is also implied in the projet Corousso, focused on the friction stir welding process.

== Facilities and equipment ==
The LCFC is one of the user of the Cassiopé computer cluster, along with the Arts et Métiers ParisTech and the University of Lorraine.

== Locations ==
- CIRAM, center of research in Metz Science Park
- Metz campus of Arts et Métiers ParisTech
