= American French Tool Co. =

- Company type: Private
- Industry: Printmaking
- Founded: 1948
- Founder: Andre Eugene Beaudoin
- Fate: Acquired by Conrad Machine Co.
- Headquarters: Coventry, Rhode Island, United States
- Products: Etching and lithography presses

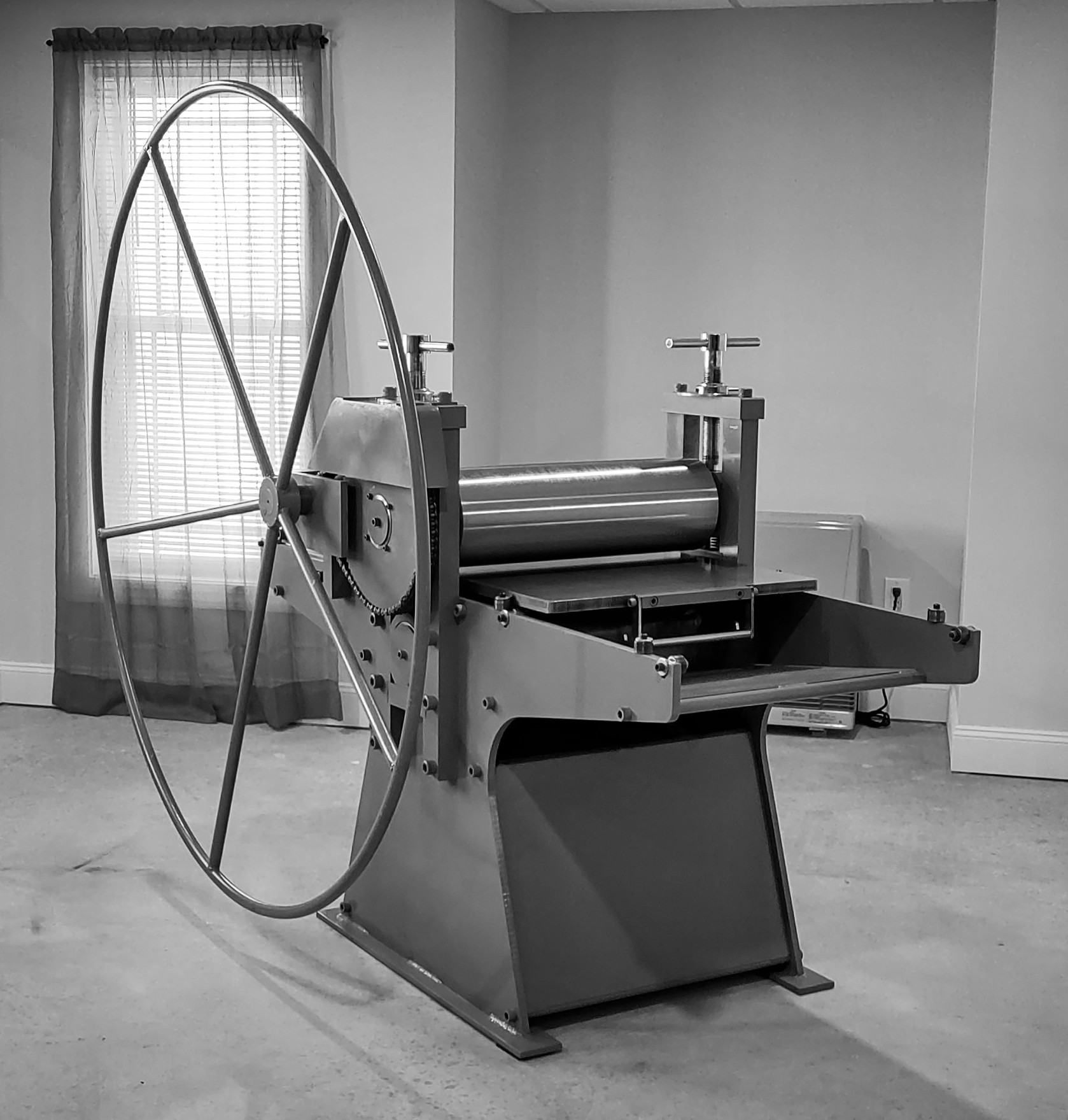
A Beaudoin-built American French Tool etching press (24" x 48" bed)

American French Tool Co., founded by Andre Beaudoin, was an independent manufacturer of etching and lithography presses from the early 1970s until its acquisition by Conrad Machine Co. in 1999. Based in Coventry, Rhode Island, their product line of large floor model presses were highly regarded by professionals for their design, durability, and precision. By 1980, American French Tool presses were installed in over 300 universities and workshops throughout North America and Europe.

Conrad Machine Co. continues to produce printmaking presses under the American French Tool name, based on the original designs.

== History ==
Andre Eugene Beaudoin (April 11, 1920 – August 8, 2008) was born in Calais, France, and attended the Ecole des Arts de Metiers, where he studied machine design and metallurgy. He later emigrated to the United States and studied photography at Brown University.

In 1948, Beaudoin established American French Tool Co. in Coventry. At that time, its primary business was the import and sale of weaving machinery such as looms. By 1969, the company was also listed as a manufacturer of etching presses and they were being advertised in magazines and journals by the following year.
