= Laboratory of Microstructure Studies and Mechanics of Materials =

French laboratory in Metz

LEM3
- Laboratory of study of microstructures, mechanics and material sciences
- Latin: Laboratoire d'étude des microstructures et de mécanique des matériaux
- Established: 2011
- Research type: applied research
- Field of research: mechanics, Electronics, composite material, shape memory alloy
- Director: El Mostafa DAYA
- Faculty: 59
- Students: 56
- Location: Metz, 57070, France; 49.09407°N 6.22618°E
- Campus: Metz Science Park
- CNRS: UMR CNRS 7239
- Affiliations: Arts et Métiers ParisTech; University of Lorraine; ENIM
- Website: http://www.lem3.univ-lorraine.fr/

The Laboratory of study of microstructures, mechanics and material sciences (French: Laboratoire d'étude des microstructures et de mécanique des matériaux), also known as the LEM3, is a French laboratory of research located in Metz. It is under the authority of Arts et Métiers ParisTech, University of Lorraine and ENIM. It is part of the Carnot Institute ARTS and currently employs more than 150 persons. It was created in 2011 from the merge of 2 CNRS laboratories, the LPMM and the LETAM. The LEM3 plays an important role in the competitiveness organization "Materialia" and in the new research institute M2P.

== Teaching and research topics ==
The main part of the research is focused on the following lines :

- Multi-scale material characterization
- Material behavior of high-yield steels
- Study of smart materials : composite material, SMA, piezoelectric material

== Research teams ==
The laboratory is divided in seven research teams, which have their own field of research :

1. TMP : Texture, microstructure and process
2. MeNu : computational mechanics
3. APLI : Auto-organization, plasticity and intern lengths
4. 3TAM : transformation, textures, topology and metal anisotropy
5. SMART : Multi-phased systems, rheology, fatigue and applications
6. SIP : surface, interface and process
7. CeDyn : extreme conditions and dynamics

== Projects ==
The LEM3 is behind the creation of the Labex DAMAS (laboratory of excellence for alloyed metals) which get a financial support of 7.5 million euros over 8 years.

== Facilities and equipment ==
In 2013, a microscope with the electron backscatter detector technology was funded by the Lorraine Region (one million euros). The laboratory also has a high-strength multi-axial tensile test machine with a capacity of 72 tons per axis.

== Locations ==
- CIRAM, center of research in Metz Science Park
- Metz campus of Arts et Métiers ParisTech
