= AM-69 Georges Payre =

General information
- Type: Two seat light homebuilt trainer aircraft
- Manufacturer: AM (Arts et Métiers ParisTech), Cluny
- Number built: 1

History
- First flight: 6 May 1973
- Retired: 1975
- Developed from: Gaucher TRG-662

The AM-69 Georges Payre, also known as the Arts & Métiers AM-69 and the ENAM-69/70, was a conventionally laid out low wing monoplane designed and built by French students in the early 1970s. It was intended as a trainer, seating two in tandem.

== Design and development ==
Design of the AM-69 began in 1969 as the name suggests, when a group of twelve students of the school started from the incomplete design of the Gaucher TRG-662, a tandem seat light aircraft. The AM machine was to be a two-seat training aircraft and the design work occupied the students for some 3,000 hours. Its construction, undertaken by another group of ten students took 4,000 hours, with the AM-69 flying on 6 May 1973. It was named after one of their lecturers.

The prototype AM-69 was an all-wood, low wing cantilever monoplane. Its wings, skinned with birch plywood had a modified Mureau 234 section with a maximum thickness-to-chord ratio of 13.2%, notable for the large area of both upper and lower surfaces which were flat. There was dihedral over the whole wing and a full-span combination of inboard flaps and ailerons.

The Georges Payre was powered by a 67 kW (90 hp) Continental C90 air-cooled flat four engine in the nose of its rectangular section, round decked fuselage. Fuel tanks were in the wings. The occupants sat in tandem under a long, framed canopy with individual, starboard-hinged sections for access. Solo control was from the forward seat, over the wing. The conventional cantilever tail had swept, straight-edged vertical surfaces, with a rudder that extended to the keel and horizontal surfaces mounted at mid-fuselage height forward of the rudder hinge. The control surfaces were horn balanced and there was a large trim tab on the port elevator.

The AM-69's fixed, conventional undercarriage borrowed heavily from other designs. The main legs and wheels, mounted onto the front wing spar, were from a Robin DR.220 and the tailwheel was a modified Stampe SV.4 component.

The ENAM students began the design of an all-metal version, with larger tail surfaces and revised canopy and engine cowling, intending it to be homebuilt from plans but nothing seems to have come of this.

== Operational history ==
After its first flight the AM-69 gained its certificate of airworthiness (CoA) in July 1973 and was owned by the Centre Recherche Application des Techniques d'Education Populaire et Sport (CRATEPS) at Montceau-les-Mines for two years, after which the CoA lapsed and the aircraft was eventually removed from the Civil Register. The airframe was still in storage there in 1995.

== Specifications (prototype) ==
Data from Jane's All the World's Aircraft 1976/77

General characteristics

- Crew: two
- Length: 7.90 m (25 ft 11 in)
- Wingspan: 8.94 m (29 ft 4 in)
- Wing area: 11.20 m^{2} (120.6 sq ft)
- Airfoil: Mureaux 234 modified
- Empty weight: 524 kg (1,155 lb)
- Max takeoff weight: 728 kg (1,605 lb)
- Fuel capacity: 84 L (18.5 Imp gal; 22.2 US gal)
- Powerplant: 1 × Continental C90-14F air-cooled flat four, 67 kW (90 hp)
- Propellers: 2-bladed Ratier, ground adjustable pitch

Performance

- Maximum speed: 195 km/h (121 mph, 105 kn)
- Cruise speed: 160 km/h (99 mph, 86 kn)
- Stall speed: 75 km/h (47 mph, 40 kn) flaps down
- Never exceed speed: 250 km/h (160 mph, 130 kn)
- Range: 600 km (370 mi, 320 nmi) with maximum fuel
- Service ceiling: 3,500 m (11,500 ft) service
- Rate of climb: 3.0 m/s (590 ft/min) at sea level
- Take-off distance to 15 m (50 ft): 500 m (1,640 ft)
- Landing distance from 15 m (50 ft): 380 m (1,250 ft)
