= LBM =

LBM may refer to:

- Laboratory of biomechanics of Arts et Métiers ParisTech
- Interleaved Bitmap Format filename extension
- Lattice Boltzmann methods in fluid dynamics
- Pound (mass), lbm or lb_{m}
- Lean body mass
- Location-based media
- London Borough of Merton, UK
- Laser beam machining
- Logical Business Machines, a defunct computer company
- Little Brown Mushroom, a publishing house founded by Alec Soth
- Live bivalve mollusc
- Lumber and Building Materials
- Loose bowel movement, commonly referred as diarrhea
- Large behavior models
