= Conrad Machine Co. =

American manufacturer

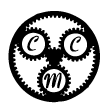
- Type: Private
- Industry: Manufacturing (printmaking)
- Founded: 1945
- Founder: Earl Conrad; Robert Conrad
- Headquarters: Whitehall, Michigan, United States
- Products: Etching and lithography presses
- Owner: Tom Conrad
- Website: conradmachine.com

Conrad Machine Co. is an independent manufacturer of etching and lithography presses, which it first began producing in 1956. The company was founded in 1945 by brothers Earl and Robert Conrad, and they offered general engineering services as well as their own products. The company moved to Whitehall, Michigan in 1973.

In addition to their own brand, Conrad manufactures presses under the American French Tool label, having absorbed the American French Tool Co. in 1999. Similarly, they offer press designs under the names "Rembrandt" and "Brand New", the latter being a revised version of the press sold by the Charles Brand press company that operated from 1965 to 1990.
