= École nationale supérieure d'électronique, informatique, télécommunications, mathématique et mécanique de Bordeaux =

Engineering grande école in Bordeaux, France

Coordinates: 44°48′24″N 0°36′21″W

Bordeaux Institute of Technology - Enseirb-Matmeca School of Engineering
- Other names: EIRB
- Type: French Grande École
- Established: 1920
- Academic affiliations: CGE, CDEFI, Aerospace Valley, France AEROTECH
- President: Éric Kerhervé
- Academic staff: 124
- Administrative staff: 70
- Students: 1200+
- Doctoral students: 136
- Location: Bordeaux, France
- Campus: University of Bordeaux
- Colours: Black and yellow
- Mascot: The Bee
- Website: enseirb-matmeca.bordeaux-inp.fr/fr

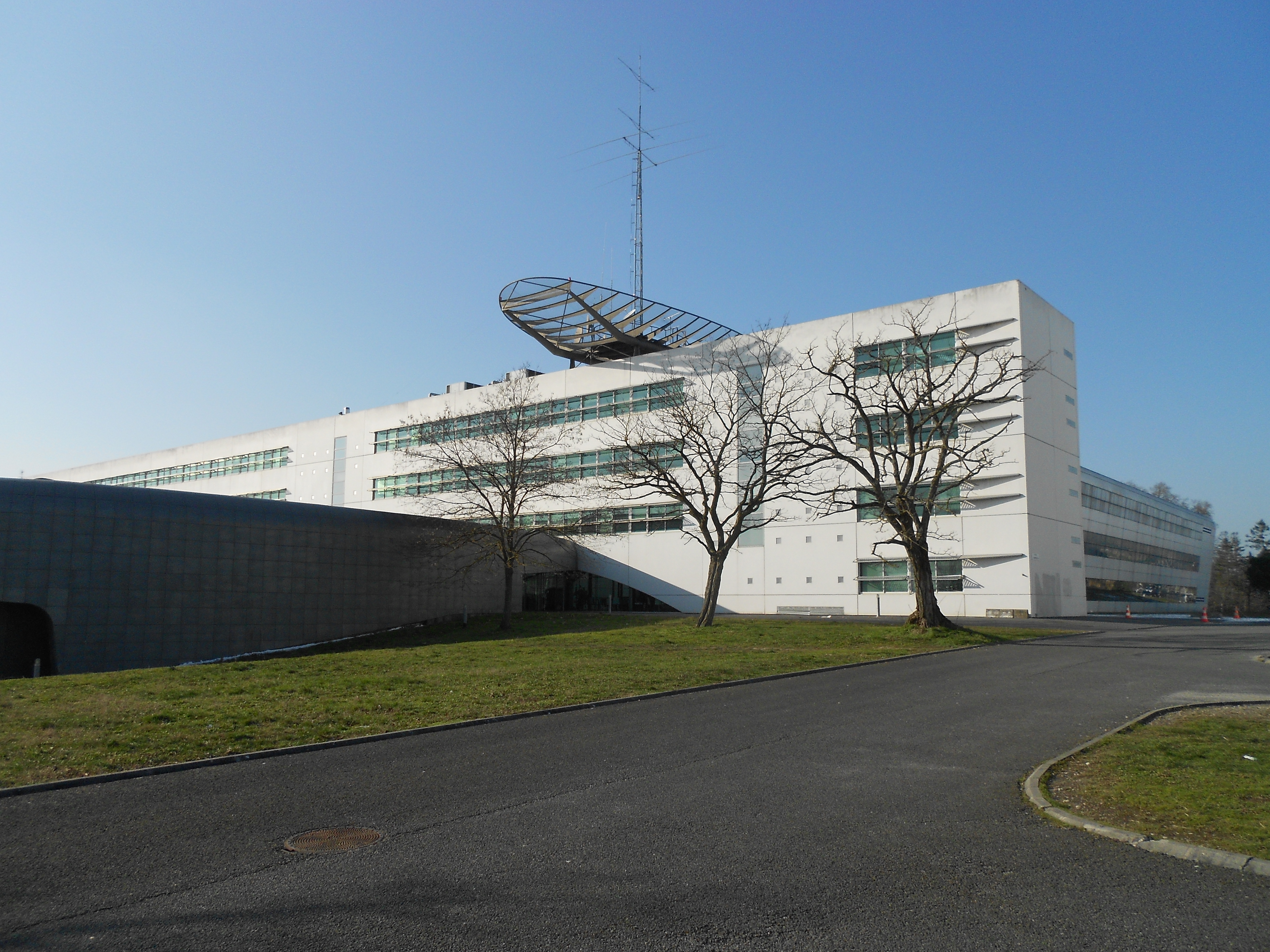
ENSEIRB-MATMECA engineering school.

Bordeaux Institute of Technology - ENSEIRB-MATMECA School of Engineering (in French: Bordeaux INP - ENSEIRB-MATMECA) is a French Engineering Grande École located in Bordeaux and specialized in Electrical Engineering, Electronics, Computer Science, Telecommunications, Mechanical Engineering and Mathematics.

The majority of the admitted students are selected among candidates from the French Preparatory Classes for Engineering Schools which is a 2 to 3-year undergraduate level program in Mathematics, Physics, Chemistry and Engineering Sciences. After admission, the standard curriculum is a 3-year program resulting in the French Diplôme d'Ingénieur, considered as a Master's degree of the European Higher Education Area.

== History ==
=== École Nationale Supérieure d’Électronique, d’Informatique et de Radiocommunications de Bordeaux (ENSEIRB) ===
- 1920 : The "Telegraphy School of Bordeaux" is established. At this stage, the school trains engineers to become radio operators.
- 1936 : The school becomes "School of Radioelectricity of Bordeaux".
- 1940 : The name changes again for "School of modern applications of radio of Bordeaux".
- 1975 : The school becomes a national engineering school and is renamed to "École Nationale Supérieure d’Électronique et de Radioélectricité de Bordeaux"
- 1986 : The Computer Science department is created.
- 2000 : The Telecommunications department is created, and the name changes to "École Nationale Supérieure d’Électronique, d’Informatique et de Radiocommunications de Bordeaux" (ENSEIRB).
- 2002 : The Networks and Telecommunications track is created.
- 2008 : The Embedded Electronic Systems track is created

=== École d’Ingénieurs en Modélisation Mathématique et Mécanique (MATMECA) ===
- 1986 : MATMECA is created as a Magister degree of the University of Bordeaux 1.
- 1997 : The "École Nationale d’Ingénieurs en Modélisation Mathématique et Mécanique" becomes a University of Bordeaux 1's school.

=== Institut Polytechnique de Bordeaux (Bordeaux Institute of Technology) ===
- 2009
1. ENSEIRB and MATMECA merge with other Grandes Ecoles to create the Institut Polytechnique de Bordeaux (Bordeaux Institute of Technology).
2. ENSEIRB and MATMECA merge to become ENSEIRB-MATMECA.
- 2010 : ENSEIRB-MATMECA is among the Mines-Telecom institute network.
- 2011 : The school confirms its membership to the AEROTECH network with other French Grandes Ecoles such as ENAC, Arts et Métiers ParisTech, Centrale Lyon and Centrale Nantes.

== Admissions ==
As a Grande École, the school recruits the majority of the students after the selection made by the competitive examination which is the final step of two years of intensive Classes Préparatoires aux Grandes Écoles. Each department has its own required admission rank that is determined by the number of candidates that want to integrated the department. Other ways to integrate the school exist, some students are admitted to the school after the university or after two years of specific integrated preparatory classes at the Cycle Préparatoire Intégré de Bordeaux.

== Research and teaching ==
=== Engineering Cursus ===
==== Electronic Track ====
The objective of the Electronic track is to train general electronics engineers, able to control electronic modules as well as design hardware and software systems.

==== Computer Science Track ====
This track is covering all aspects of Computer Science, both in its theoretical and fundamental aspects.

==== Telecommunications ====
Covers all subjects related to telecommunications systems (design and development of hardware devices and software for telecommunications and networks, control of appropriate telecommunications and network systems, control architectures and distributed applications).

- The first year in this sector is a core discovery of Telecommunications systems.
- The second year is offering a panel of effective courses to define a coherent professional project.
- The third year is divided into four telecommunications main options : software engineering of telecommunication, networks and communicating embedded systems, digital systems engineering, communication systems.

==== Mathematical and mechanical specialty ====
Specialty mathematical modeling in mechanics (MATMECA) trains engineers in controlling large numerical simulation tools and computer. In the world of industry, many phenomenas from backgrounds or complex systems can be described using systems of equations with partial derivatives. Engineers are able to develop the necessary tools for this type of study and mastery of their use because they would have a good understanding of the physical and mechanical phenomena. They have also a very good knowledge of the great mathematical modeling approaches continuum ( solid mechanics and structures, fluid mechanics, waves and vibrations).

== Ranking ==
ENSEIRB-MATMECA has a A rating among French Grandes Ecoles.

== Double degree ==
The school offers several opportunities to achieve a Double Degree with international universities including Illinois Institute of Technology, Huazhong University of Science and Technology, Tomsk State University of Control Systems and Radio-electronics, University of Brasília.

== Robotics association ==
EIRBOT is the robotics association of ENSEIRB-MATMECA. The school's four departments create an ideal setting to build robots. EIRBOT's main goal is to participate to the French Robotics Cup, which is part of the Eurobot Open. The association has been designing and building robots from scratch since 2003 (before that, EIRBOT was known as the Robotics Club of ENSEIRB-MATMECA). Knowledge sharing between members is an essential value of the association. EIRBOT is also a cradle of ideas and projects. Loïc Dauphin, president of the association in 2013–2014, was recently awarded a price from INRIA for his Aversive++ project , a generic multi microcontroller API, which he started as a project within the association with the help of Clément Lansmarie and some other members to program robots. This project is now supported by INRIA.

In 2015/2016, EIRBOT's sponsors are: ENSEIRB-MATMECA Bordeaux Graduate School, Elsys Design, Bear and Armadeus.
