= Lille Laboratory of Mechanics =

French research laboratory

LML
- Lille Laboratory of Mechanics
- Established: 1989
- Research type: applied research
- Field of research: Electrical engineering, Electronics
- Director: Francis Piriou
- Faculty: 30
- Students: 43
- Location: Lille, France; 50.606°N 3.136°E
- Campus: Arts et Métiers ParisTech - CER Lille
- CNRS: CNRS UMR 9014
- Affiliations: Arts et Métiers ParisTech; École centrale de Lille; HEI; Polytech'Lille; University of Lille
- Website: https://lmfl.cnrs.fr/en/home/

The Laboratoire de mécanique de Lille (LML) is a French research laboratory (UMR 8107) part of the Carnot Institute ARTS. More than 200 people work in this laboratory which was created in 1985.

It supports academic activities in the following graduate schools:

- Arts et Métiers ParisTech (ENSAM)
- École centrale de Lille
- University of Lille

It supports doctoral researches and hosts PhD doctoral candidates in relationship with the European Doctoral College Lille Nord de France.

== Research area ==
With more than two hundreds researchers, LML focuses on the following research area:

- Mechanical reliability and Tribology; applications on brakes
- Fluid mechanics; Turbulence; Turbo machines
- Civil engineering; Soil mechanics

== Equipment and facilities ==
The laboratory has heavy investigation equipment in its 3 research areas. These machines include a 20 meters long wind tunnel to study fluid mechanics, a multi-axis tensile test machine, to study mechanical behavior of complex materials and a micro-scale fatigue machine to study material life cycle.

Computations run thanks to a calculation cluster (HPC) composed of 288 cores.

== Former members of the Laboratoire de mécanique de Lille ==
- Joseph Valentin Boussinesq, professor at COMUE Lille Nord de France and at Institut industriel du Nord, known for Boussinesq approximation (water waves) in Fluid mechanics
- Joseph Kampé de Fériet, professor at COMUE Lille Nord de France and founder of the Institut de mécanique des fluides de Lille (ONERA Lille)
