= Naval Academy Research Institute =

Research and training institute in Brest, France

IRENav
- Naval Academy Research Institute
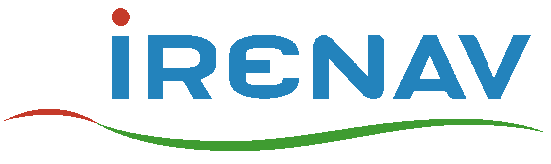
- Latin: Institut de recherche de l’École navale
- Established: 2000
- Research type: Applied research
- Field of research: Mechanics, Energy, Maritime Information Processing, Ship of the future
- Director: André ASTOLFI (since january 2018)
- Location: Brest, France, 29240, France; 48.279361°N 4.415337°W
- Campus: Arts et Métiers Paritech
- Affiliations: École Navale; HCERES Hosting team (EA3634)
- Website: https://www.ecole-navale.fr/en/node/50832

The Naval Academy Research Institute (IRENav) is a multidisciplinary research and scientific training center under the institutional umbrella of the École navale and the École Nationale Supérieure d'Arts et Métiers. Created in 2000, IRENav is labeled (EA3634) within the framework of the laboratories of the École Nationale Supérieure d'Arts et Métiers and evaluated by the HCERES (Haut Conseil de l’évaluation de la recherche et de l’enseignement supérieur). It is also a member of the Institut Carnot Arts, a major research network that drives industrial innovation at the national level.

IRENAV develops maritime and naval research activities in the fields of mechanical engineering, energy conversion and maritime information systems and underwater acoustics.

IRENav is the essential support for the scientific training of Naval Engineering student cadets in the fields of Mechanics, Energy, Underwater Acoustics, Signal Processing, Computer Science and Information Systems.

It is made up of about 65 research and teaching members of staff, including 25 academics and post-doctoral researchers, about 25 PhD students and 15 technical and administrative support.

The institute's activities are intended to be dual, addressing both military and civilian research problems in the context of the ship of the future. Research activities are oriented towards mechanics and energy from a hydrodynamic and electrotechnical point of view, observation of the marine environment using underwater acoustic techniques (ASM) and Geographic Information Systems (GIS). The research is conducted by two groups.

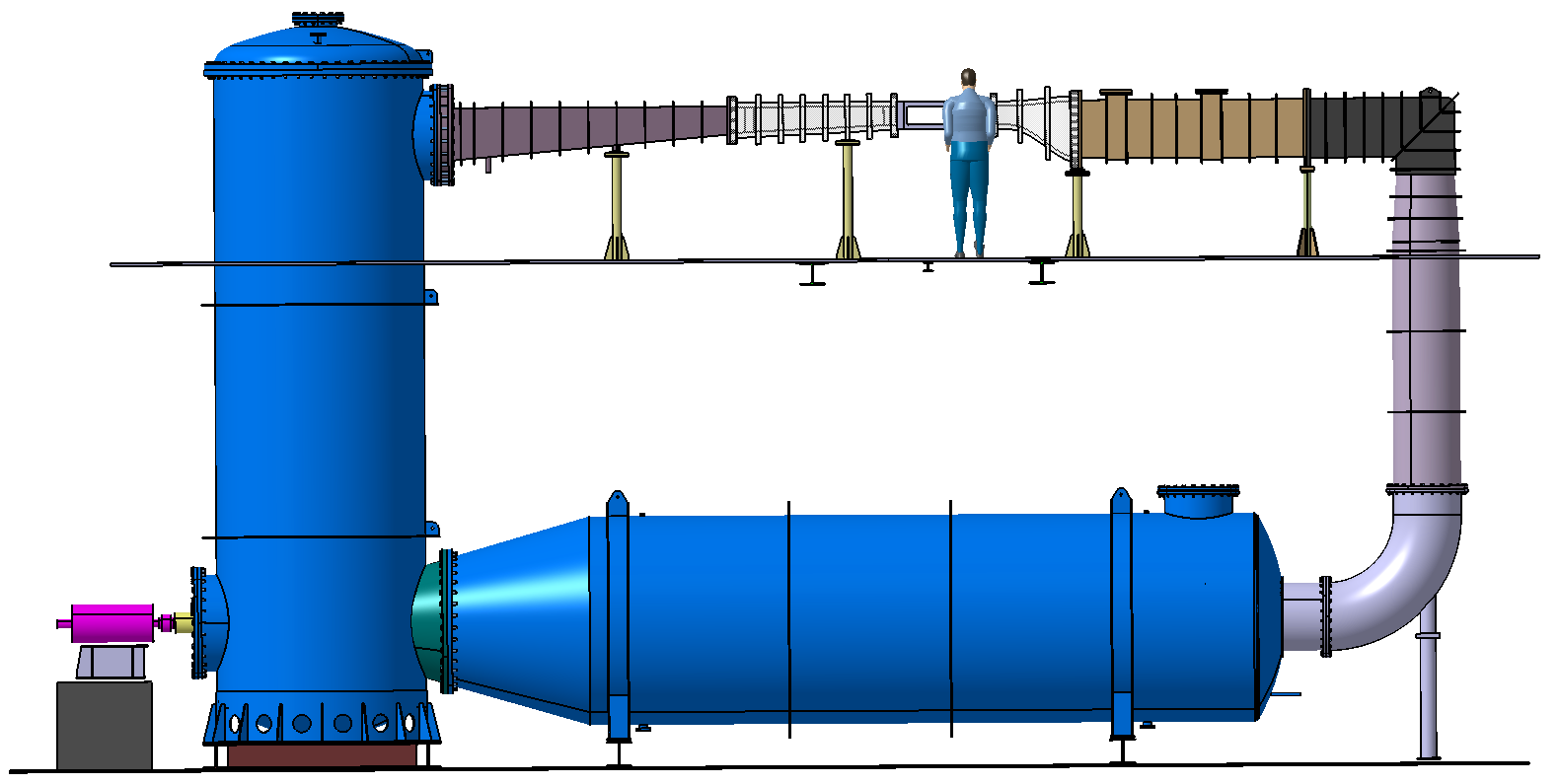
IRENAV - Cavitation tunnel

== The M2EN group (Mechanics and Energy in Naval Environment) ==
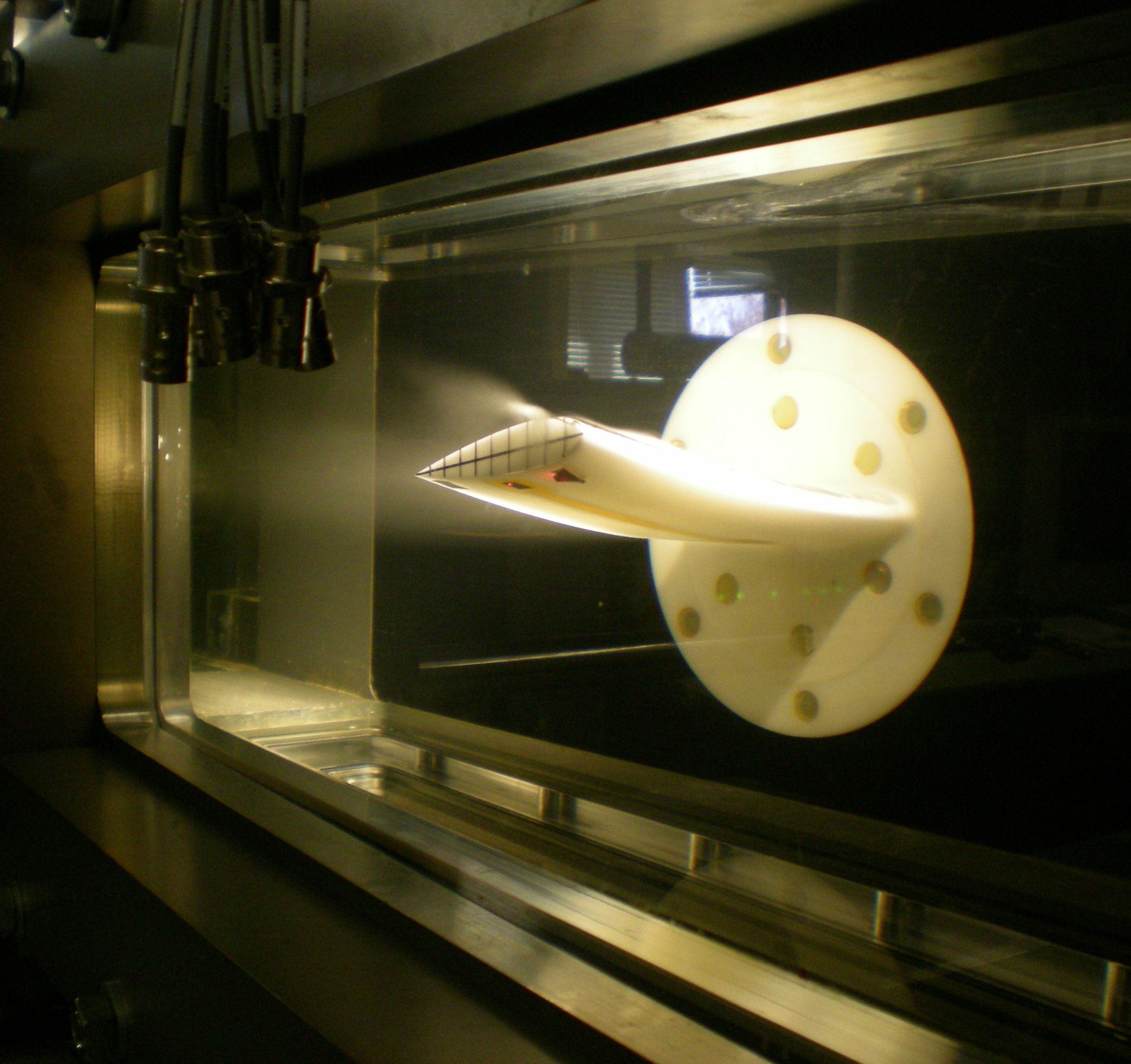
Flexible hydrofoil during experimental campaign in cavitation tunnel

The Marine Engineering and Energy Group (M2EN) is a multidisciplinary group in fluid mechanics and electrical engineering. The research is organized along two axes in interaction. The first relates to hydrodynamics, and in particular fluid structure interactions in heavy fluid and two-phase flows. The second deals with energy conversion from the angle of modeling and the design of conversion chains and the development of unconventional electric machines for propulsion. The team has unique experimental means (hydrodynamic platform, instrumentation) and develops high value-added measurement techniques to characterize and understand the physical phenomena specific to naval systems. The upstream and dual character of the team's research makes it possible to open up research in the field of energy in the broad sense as that of the naval propulsion for the ship of the future and the prospective one of the Marine Energies.

== The group MOTIM (Modeling and Processing of Maritime Information) ==
The Maritime Information Modeling and Processing Group (MoTIM) is a multidisciplinary group whose research focuses on the processing of maritime information, involving three complementary areas of research: information science, underwater acoustics, marine and signal processing. In the field of Information Science, the research developed is based on the theory and modeling of geographic and temporal information. Underwater Acoustics work resides in the interaction between real work and the development of physical models and signal processing tools (time-frequency analysis). One of the group's research projects is Cyber Defense related to the Chair of Cyber Defense of Naval Systems.

== The Chair of "Cyber Defense of Naval Systems" ==
The Chair of "Cyber Defense of Naval Systems" was created in October 2014 under the tutelage of the French Navy as part of the Cyber Action Plan decided by the Minister of the Armed Forces; it hasa strong legitimacy in the naval field.

The chair includes two privileged academic partners: IMT Atlantique and ENSTA Bretagne. The two industrial partners Naval Group and Thales (leaders of their sector) and research scientists(scientific experts in cyberdefense) reinforce the cyber expertise of the chair. The Chair of Cyber Defense of Naval Systems is at the heart of a strategic ecosystem driven by issues of cybernetic attacks in the maritime environment. The project has, since the beginning, benefited from the support of the French Navy, the Brittany region and the Cyber Center of Excellence.

== A Research Center for Maritime Innovation and Technology Transfer ==
The French Naval Academy plays an important role in the creation of new knowledge and transfer of technological know-how through its research institute. This is done by working with big companies and SMEs through various contractual relations. Researchers work with these companies by supporting them with their knowledge through doctorates, contracts, services, collaborations or industrial chairs.

These actions are supported by a series of major valorisation partners:

- Institut Carnot ARTS (Research Actions for Technology and Society): The Carnot label is given to public research laboratories which develop research activities alongside socio-economic actors, in order to respond to their needs.
- AMValor: technology transfer branch of Arts & Métiers which promotes research partnerships activities through collaborations between laboratories and businesses.
- SATT Ouest Valorisation: ensures public research results valorisation in order to offer innovation resources.
- Réseau NOÉ: network that gathers actors of the European research and innovation projects in the Western part of France.

== Civil training courses at IRENAV ==
- The M2 research master's degree in Mechanics and Energy in Naval Environment (Ecole Navale-Arts et Métiers ParisTech)

This M2 level training focuses mainly on the acquisition of in-depth knowledge of the upstream study of naval environment systems through a multidisciplinary approach. This training builds on the unique skills and resources of IRENav in the research areas. This M2 research master is proposed in co-supervision between the École Navale and the ENSAM and opens perspectives of doctoral training within the IRENav and its academic and industrial partners.

- Atlantic Master in Ship Operations and Naval Engineering (AMASONE)

The École navale and the École Centrale de Nantes have joined forces to offer an international master's degree course in naval engineering and naval operations. This master is aimed mainly at foreign students who wish to perfect their training in France in the disciplines of marine engineering. This training in hydrodynamics and propulsion is based on a practical experience of ship steering and gives an important place to the techniques of conducting operations.
