= Institute of mechanics and engineering =

French research institute

I2M
- Institute of mechanics and engineering
- Latin: Institut de mécanique et d'ingénierie
- Established: 2011
- Research type: applied research
- Field of research: mechanics, Engineering, material sciences, civil engineering
- Director: Eric Arquis
- Faculty: 133
- Students: 107
- Location: Bordeaux, 33607, France; 44.8027504°N 0.60206360°W
- Campus: Arts et Métiers ParisTech - CER bordeaux
- CNRS: UMR CNRS 5295
- Affiliations: University of Bordeaux; INP Bordeaux
- Website: http://i2m.u-bordeaux.fr/

The Institute of mechanics and engineering (French: Institut de mécanique et d'ingénierie), also known as the I2M, is a French institute of research located in Bordeaux, more precisely in the science Campus of Talence, Pessac and Gradignan. It is under the authority of University of Bordeaux, CNRS / INSIS, Arts et Métiers ParisTech, Bordeaux INP and INRA. It is in addition part of the Carnot Institute ARTS and currently employs more than 300 persons. It was created in 2011 from the merge of 3 "Unités Mixtes de Recherche" CNRS/University laboratories: LMP, TREFLE, US2B and 3 "Equipes d'Accueil" of Research Ministry: LAMEFIP, LGM2B, GHYMAC. The I2M is also part of the IdEX Bordeaux (LabEX AMADEUS, CPU, EquipEx XYLOFOREST) and of the interregional cluster AEROSPACE VALLEY Aerospace Valley.

== Teaching and research topics ==
The main part of the research is focused on the following lines :

- Nondestructive testing, composite material, process engineering
- Civil engineering and energy

== Research teams ==
The laboratory is divided in six research teams, which have their own field of research :

1. DUMAS (durability of materials, systems and structures)
2. APY (acoustics and physics)
3. TREFLE (Fluid dynamics, energy)
4. IMC (mechanical engineering and design)
5. MPI (material sciences and process engineering)
6. GCE (civil engineering and environment)

2 cross-disciplinary teams also exist and cover the fields of nondestructive testing and wood engineering.

== Projects ==
Since its creation, the institute plays an important role in the project "H2E" (Horizon Hydrogen energie). Its work is mainly focused on two fields : multi-scale characterization and development of a new kind of mechanical test. As a member of the association Fondaterra, the I2M is also in charge of a massive geological studies program in order to certify the occupation of lands.

== Facilities and equipment ==
High-tech apparatus are available in the institute especially in the fields of optics and numerical computations :

- Scanning transmission electron microscope (STEM)
- Supercomputer with 400 processors
- Femto-seconds laser

== Locations ==
- University of Bordeaux (Talence, Gradignan, Carreire)
- Bordeaux INP (Pessac)
- Bordeaux campus of Arts et Métiers (Talence)
