= France AEROTECH =

French aviation school

France AEROTECH is the name of the French national network for aeronautical and space grandes écoles (engineering graduate schools).

It has been created in 2011 by Arts et Métiers ParisTech, École centrale de Lyon, École centrale de Nantes, École nationale de l'aviation civile and École nationale supérieure d’électronique, informatique, télécommunications, mathématique et mécanique de Bordeaux.

The goals of France AEROTECH are to provide French courses abroad, developing international research projects and courses in aeronautical and space engineering, and helping emerging markets.

To achieve all these projects, the universities will create a summer program in embedded systems and a master in airworthiness.
