= Cycle préparatoire de Bordeaux =

Cycle Préparatoire de Bordeaux (CPBx)
- Type: French Classes Préparatoires aux Grandes Écoles
- Established: 1993
- Students: 90 (2012)
- Location: Bordeaux, France
- Campus: Domaine universitaire de Pessac Talence Gradignan
- Website: http://www.u-bordeaux1.fr/formation/formations-2011-2015/cycle-prepa-cpbx.html

The Cycle préparatoire de Bordeaux (CPBx) is a French Classe préparatoire aux grandes écoles which prepares students to integrate one of the 9 engineering schools in Bordeaux : ENSC, ENSCBP, ENSEIRB-MATMECA, ENSPIMA, ENSTBB, ENSEGID, ENSGTI, Bordeaux Sciences Agro and ESTIA.

== Admission figures ==
- The number of seats in 2012 was 90 for a total of over 1000 applications. The acceptance rate was less than 9% in 2012.
- In 2013, the number of seats available was 80.
- In 2012, 37% of admitted students had received a 'Mention Très Bien' distinction at Baccalauréat.
- A large proportion of students came from a scientific cursus.
