= Laboratory of biomechanics =

French research laboratory

LBM
- Laboratory of biomechanics
- Latin: Laboratoire de biomécanique
- Research type: applied research
- Field of research: mechanics, imaging, Medicine
- Director: Wafa Skalli
- Faculty: 23
- Students: 9
- Location: Paris, France; 48.834066°N 2.357453°E
- Campus: Arts et Métiers ParisTech
- CNRS: EA CNRS 4494
- Affiliations: Arts et Métiers ParisTech
- Website: http://bio-web.paris.ensam.fr

The Institut de Biomécanique Humaine Georges Charpak (IBHGC) is a French research institute located in Paris. It was formerly called the Laboratory of Biomechanics (French: laboratoire de biomécanique) or LBM until 2013. It is under the authority of Arts et Métiers ParisTech. It is part of the Carnot Institute ARTS and currently employs more than 50 persons. It is officially recognized by the CNRS as a host research team (équipe d'acceuil n°4494).

== Teaching and research topics ==
The main part of the research is focused on the following lines :

- Modeling of bones and muscle mechanical behavior
- Improving of safety systems
- analysis of nervous system/moves interactions

== Research teams ==
The laboratory is divided in five research teams, which have their own field of research :

- team 1 : mechanical behavior of body and clinical research
- team 2 : biomechanics of shocks, confort and safety in transportation
- team 3 : biomechanics of tissues
- team 4 : biomechanics, sports and health
- team 5 : biomechanics and nervous system

== Projects ==
The LBM is working either with academic or industrial scientific partners. On the European scale, the laboratory is enrolled in 3 initiatives such as the CRAFT-Devaspim project which aims to develop a new kind of vertebral implants. The laboratory is also behind the invention of the EOS imaging system in partnership with the Nobel Prize Georges Charpak.

== Facilities and equipment ==
The laboratory has many "high-tech" apparatuses, especially in the field of medical imaging. Among them, the EOS system that it developed and improved recently. It also have access to special equipment of the Hospital Henri Mondor, which includes a test platform for moves and walk.

The 20000+ square meters building of the laboratory was completely renewed in 2013.

== Locations ==
- Arts et Métiers ParisTech
- Hospital Henri Mondor
