= Liancourt =

- Commune
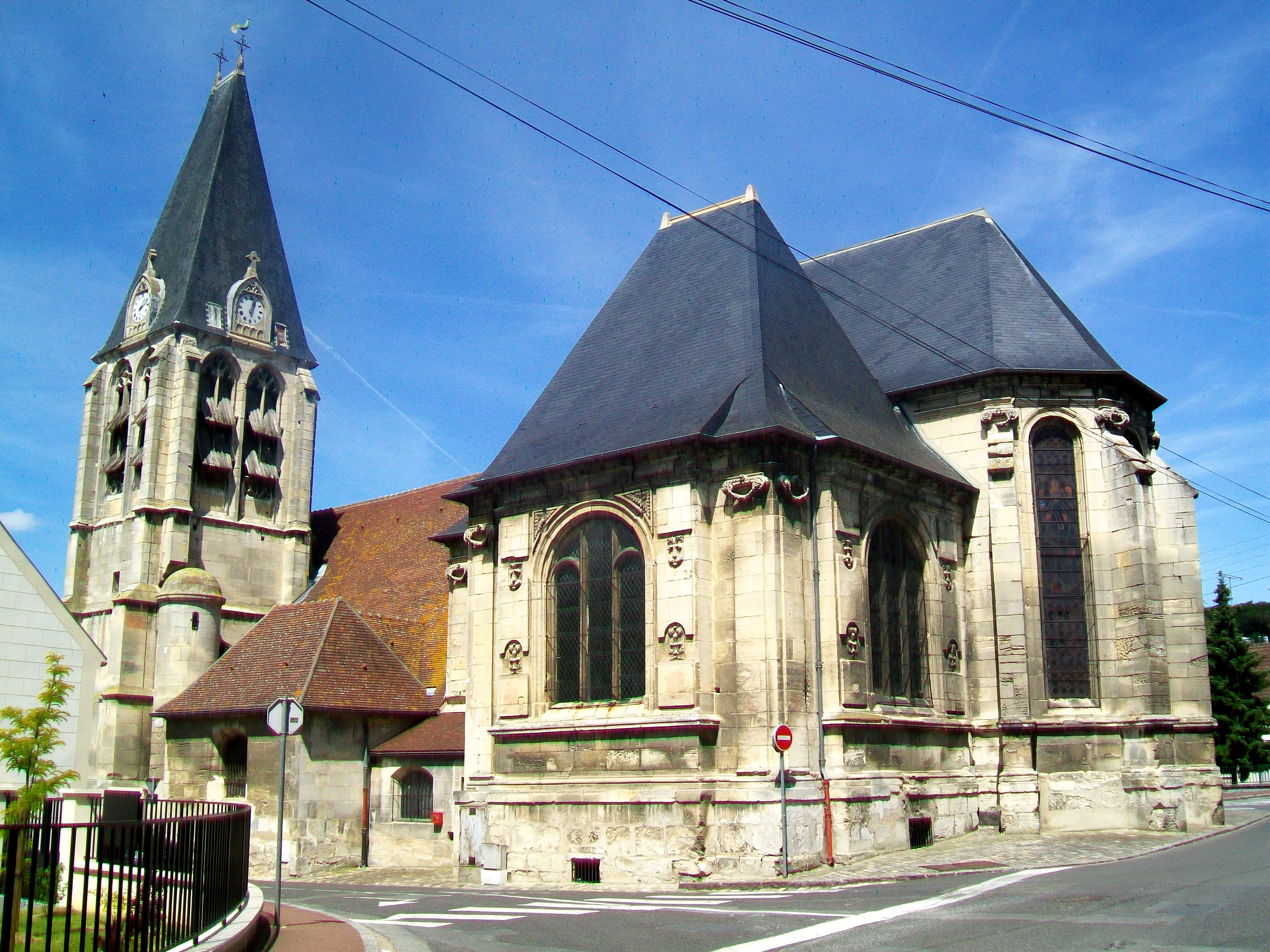
- The church in Liancourt.

- Coat of arms
- Location of Liancourt
- Location within France Location within Hauts-de-France
- Coordinates: 49°19′54″N 2°27′58″E
- Country: France
- Region: Hauts-de-France
- Department: Oise
- Arrondissement: Clermont
- Canton: Clermont
- Intercommunality: Liancourtois

Government
  - Mayor (2024–2026): Laetitia Krasmiak
- Area^{1}: 4.75 km^{2} (1.83 sq mi)
- Elevation: 107 m (351 ft)
- Highest elevation: 139 m (456 ft)
- Lowest elevation: 38 m (125 ft)
- Population (2023): 6,785
  - Density: 1,430/km^{2} (3,700/sq mi)
- Time zone: UTC+01:00 (CET)
  - Summer (DST): UTC+02:00 (CEST)
- INSEE/Postal code: 60360 /60140
- ^{1} French Land Register data, which excludes lakes, ponds, glaciers > 1 km^{2} (0.386 sq mi or 247 acres) and river estuaries.

Liancourt (French pronunciation: [ljɑ̃kuʁ]) is a commune in the Oise department in northern France.

== Population ==
Historical population
Year	Pop.	±% p.a.
1968	5,078	—
1975	5,750	+1.79%
1982	6,112	+0.88%
1990	6,178	+0.13%
1999	6,476	+0.52%
2007	7,194	+1.32%
2012	7,245	+0.14%
2017	6,880	−1.03%
2023	6,785	−0.23%
Source: INSEE

== See also ==
- Communes of the Oise department
