= Lille Laboratory of Electrical Engineering and Power Electronics =

French research lab in Lille

L2EP, EA 2697
- Lille Laboratory of Electrical Engineering and Power Electronics
- Established: 1989
- Research type: applied research
- Field of research: Electrical engineering, Electronics
- Director: Francis Piriou
- Faculty: 30
- Students: 43
- Location: Lille, France; 50.606°N 3.136°E
- Campus: Arts et Métiers ParisTech - CER Lille
- Affiliations: Arts et Métiers ParisTech; École centrale de Lille; HEI; University of Lille
- Website: http://l2ep.univ-lille1.fr/

Lille Laboratory of Electrical Engineering and Power Electronics (L2EP - French: Laboratoire d'électrotechnique et d'électronique de puissance de Lille) is a French research laboratory (CNRS EA 2697) focused on electrical engineering. It is located in Lille and is a part of Institut Carnot ARTS and COMUE Lille Nord de France.

L2EP research teams support academic activities in the following institutes of the COMUE Lille Nord de France :

- Arts et Métiers ParisTech
- École centrale de Lille
- HEI
- University of Lille

It supports doctoral researches and hosts PhD doctoral candidates in relationship with the European Doctoral College Lille Nord de France.

== Research area ==
Research area focuses on :

- Power electronics, converters, energy storage
- modeling and control
- power electronics optimisation
- modeling electrical grids
- electromagnetic simulations

L2EP Labs are the core of the Centre national de recherche technologique de Lille FUTURELEC « Réseaux et machines électriques du futur ».
