= Laboratory for Bioregenerative Medicine and Surgery =

Coordinates: 40.764177°N 73.954772°W

The Laboratory for Bioregenerative Medicine and Surgery (LBMS) is a leading regenerative medicine research laboratory within the Department of Surgery at Weill Cornell Medical College in New York City. Under the leadership of its founder and director, Jason Spector, MD FACS, the LBMS has since its inception in 2006 focused its time and resources on the study of issues most directly relevant to reconstructive surgery. These involve pharmacologic means to reduce reperfusion injury, the use of therapeutic ultrasound for noninvasive venous ablation, and most notably, a novel approach for the creation of artificial tissues.

This approach involves the fabrication of a three-dimensional construct that contains within it sacrificial microfibers that are in direct continuity with inflow and outflow macrochannels. Subsequent dissolution of the sacrificial fibers results in a construct that contains a microchannel network that closely approximates that which is found capillary beds. Most importantly, the inflow and outflow macrochannels are of sufficient size to be amenable to microsurgical manipulation, and therefore the construct is of clinical significance. This work has been reported on by the Associated Press, National Public Radio, the Discovery Channel, and Planet Green.

== See also ==
- Tissue engineering
