= Arts et Métiers ParisTech =

French engineering and research school

Arts et Métiers Institute of Technology
- Former names: ENSAM (École nationale supérieure d'arts et métiers), École impériale d'arts et métiers, Ecole d'arts et métiers
- Type: Public, Grande école
- Established: 1780; 246 years ago
- Academic affiliations: ParisTech, France AEROTECH, CGE
- Budget: €124.6 M (in 2011)
- President: Laurent Champaney
- Faculty: 600
- Students: 6200
- Location: Paris, France; 48.8341°N 2.3575°E
- Campus: Paris, Aix-en-Provence, Angers, Lille, Bordeaux, Châlons-en-Champagne, Cluny, Metz
- Institutes: Bastia, Chambéry, Chalon-sur-Saône
- Colors: Purple & orange
- Nickname: Gadzarts
- Website: www.ensam.eu

Arts et Métiers ParisTech (French pronunciation: [aʁ e metje paʁitɛk]) is a French engineering and research institute of higher education. It is a grande école, recognized for leading in the fields of mechanics and industrialization. Founded in 1780, it is among the oldest French institutions and is one of the most prestigious engineering schools in France. It has been consistently ranked among the top French engineering schools and was ranked fifth in France for Mechanical Engineering in the Shanghai ranking 2018.

The school has trained 85,000 engineers since its foundation by François Alexandre Frédéric, duc de la Rochefoucauld-Liancourt. It is a "Public Scientific, Cultural and Professional Institution" (EPSCP) under the authority of the Ministry of Higher Education and Research and has the special status of Grand établissement. The École nationale supérieure d'arts et métiers (ENSAM), which adopted the brand name "Arts et Métiers ParisTech" in 2007, was a founding member of ParisTech (Paris Institute of Technology), héSam and France AEROTECH.

Arts et Métiers ParisTech consists of eight Teaching and Research Centres (CER) and three institutes spread across the country. Its students are called Gadz'Arts.

== History ==
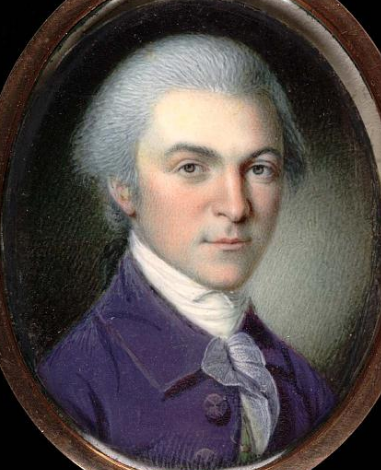
Duke of La Rochefoucauld-Liancourt

=== Foundation ===
The school was founded in Liancourt, Oise, by Duke of Rochefoucauld-Liancourt in 1780; it was originally meant to provide in-depth training for military dragoon officers children. After 1800, the institution became known as the École d'Arts et Métiers.

Under Napoleon's reign, it was known as the "École impériale des arts et métiers". He intended to use the school to train "Non-commissioned officers of Industry". The empire decided to move the school to a bigger city, Compiègne, in 1799. When Napoléon Bonaparte visited the castle where the school was located, he thought that it was inappropriate for such an industrial school to occupy the place. He decided to relocate the school to Châlons-en-Champagne in 1806, where two former monasteries were made available to offer much more space.

=== During the world wars ===
Many students and alumni enlisted in the armed forces during the World War I. It is estimated that of the 6500 gadzarts who joined the army, 1100 died the first year of the conflict. Many campuses were damaged by the war, especially that of Châlons-sur-Marne, which was in the middle of the Battle of the Marne. The Lille campus was occupied by the Germans and used as a military hospital. The other campuses were completely closed from 1916 to 1917, and the new Parisian campus was undamaged.

Between the wars, the rapid industrialization of Europe favoured the Gadzarts. The arms race pushed industry to hire more engineers and the gadzarts matched their needs perfectly. The other important factor was the creation of new ranks in the hierarchical working organization. The middle management and upper management positions were perfect for the gadzarts engineers who rapidly filled these positions in most industries; especially automotive, aeronautical and construction.

During World War II, the school tried to keep a certain level of activity. The only campuses to experience some difficulties were Lille and Châlons-sur-Marne: in 1939 no new students were admitted. The Cluny campus was the target of a roundup in 1943, and a large part of students and staff were deported. The death of Jacques Bonsergent left a mark on the conflict, he became a symbol of resistance to the oppressor.

=== Expansion and new campuses ===
The second school of this kind was founded in 1804 at Beaupréau and then transferred to Angers in 1815. Three decades later, a third school was built in Aix-en-Provence in 1843, in former barracks and monasteries.

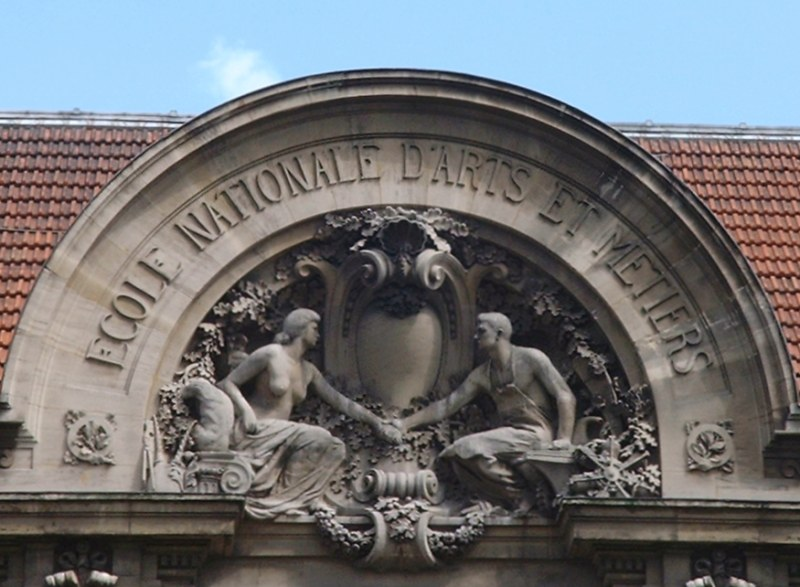
Facade of Arts et Métiers ParisTech, Paris Centre

At the dawn of the 20th century, the development of the school expanded to three new campuses. In 1891, the ancient abbey of Cluny was chosen to host the activities of the fourth school. Then, to go hand in hand with the industrial revolution, the members of parliament decided to create a fifth campus in Lille, a city that was rapidly growing. The facilities of Lille were the first ones to be built expressly for the school. The campus of Paris, a long-standing project, was built between 1906 and 1912. It became the biggest campus of the Arts et Métiers but World War II delayed the school's opening. By the end of the war, the campus had over 500 students.

In the middle of the "Trentes Glorieuses" (the Glorious Thirty), the seventh campus was created near Bordeaux, in the science park of Talence. The modern buildings were operational in 1963.

The latest campus established was Metz (1997). The campus was built in the science park, close to the transportation hubs. The school wanted this campus to become an international one, being close to Belgium, Luxembourg and Germany. Its construction was also motivated by partnerships with German (KIT) and American (Georgia Tech) universities.

Between 1990 and 2000, the three institutes of research were created: Chambéry in 1994, Chalon-sur-Saône in 1997 and Bastia in 2000.

The school also has two satellite campuses in Bouc-bel-Air and Laval that are under the authority of the main campuses of Aix-en-provence and Angers. These satellites are linked to the research programs and laboratories of the school.

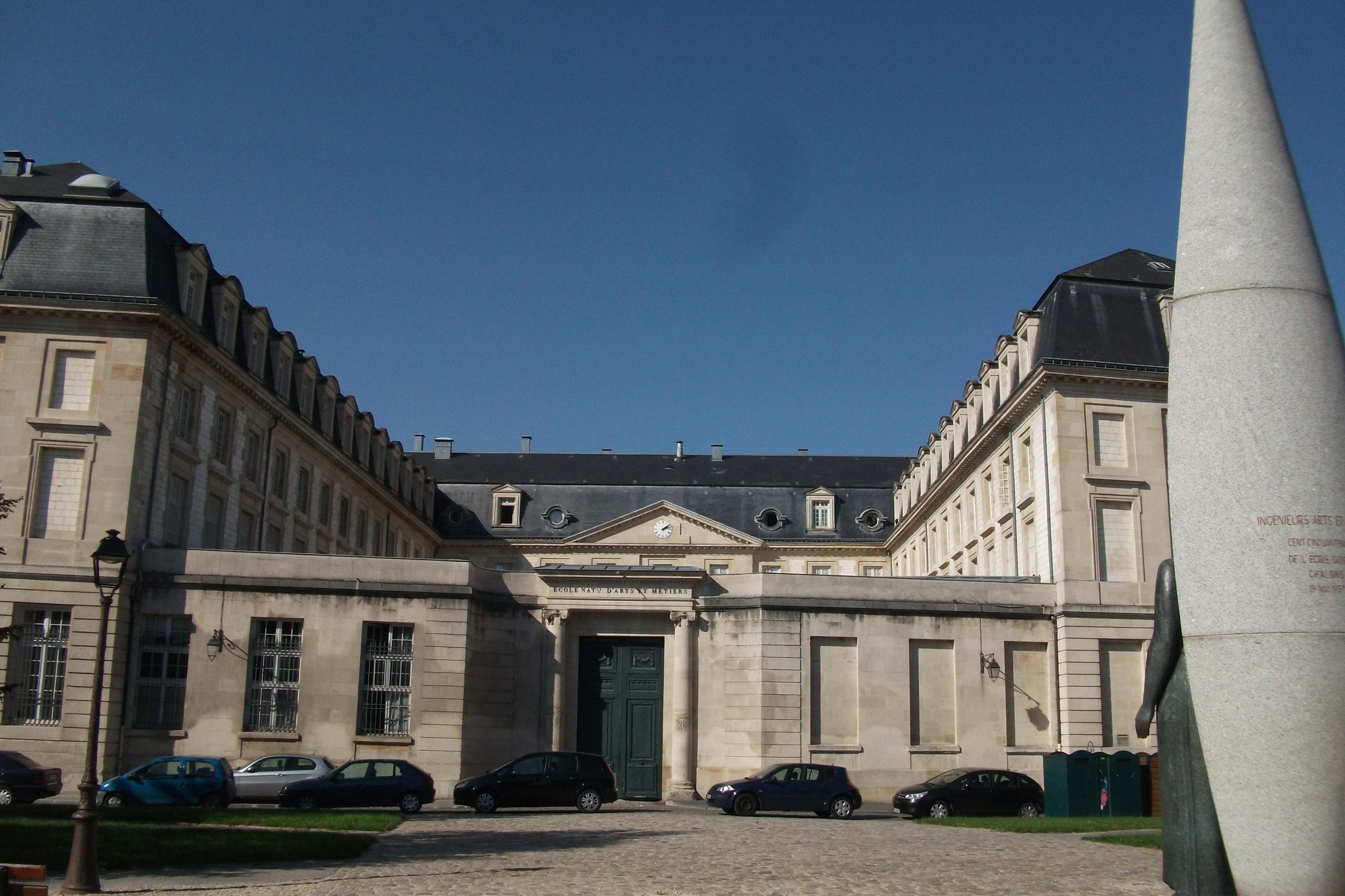
Châlons-en-Champagne centre (1806).

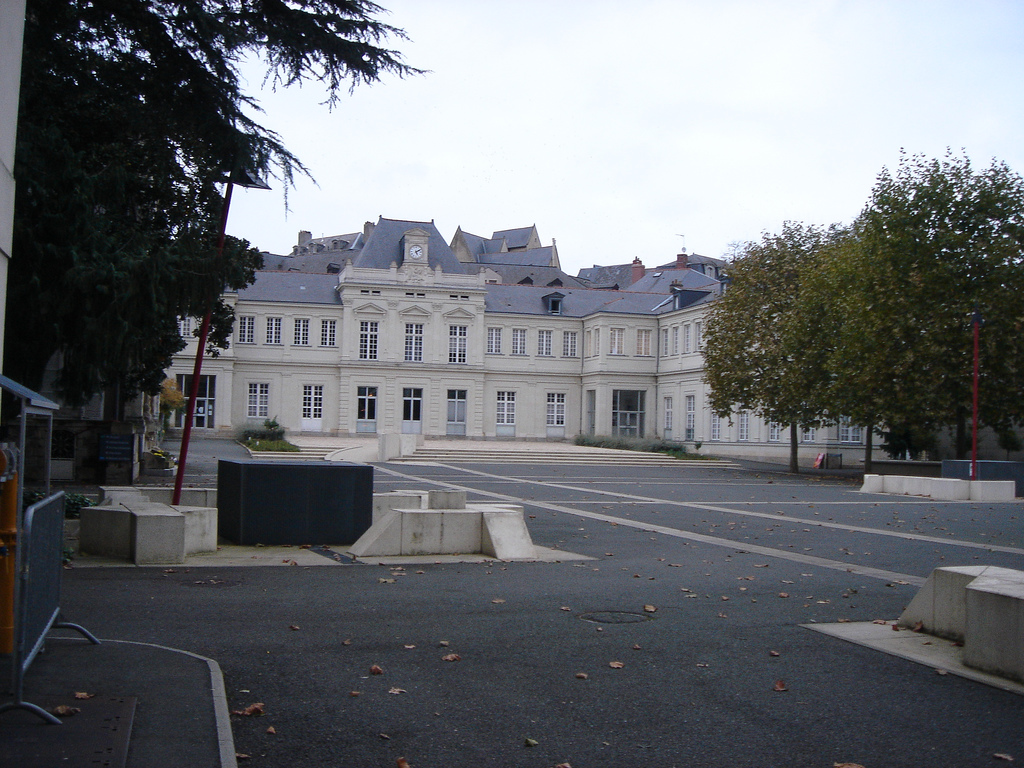
Angers centre (1815).

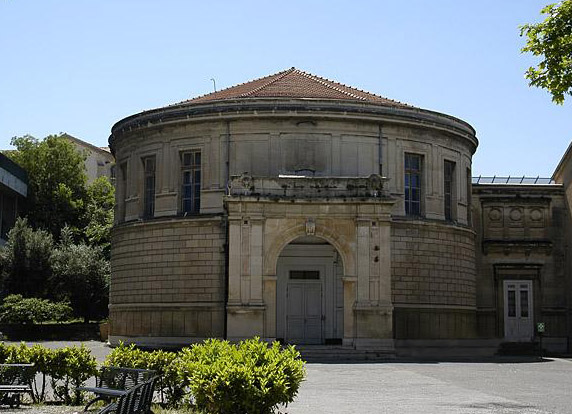
Aix-en-Provence centre (1843).

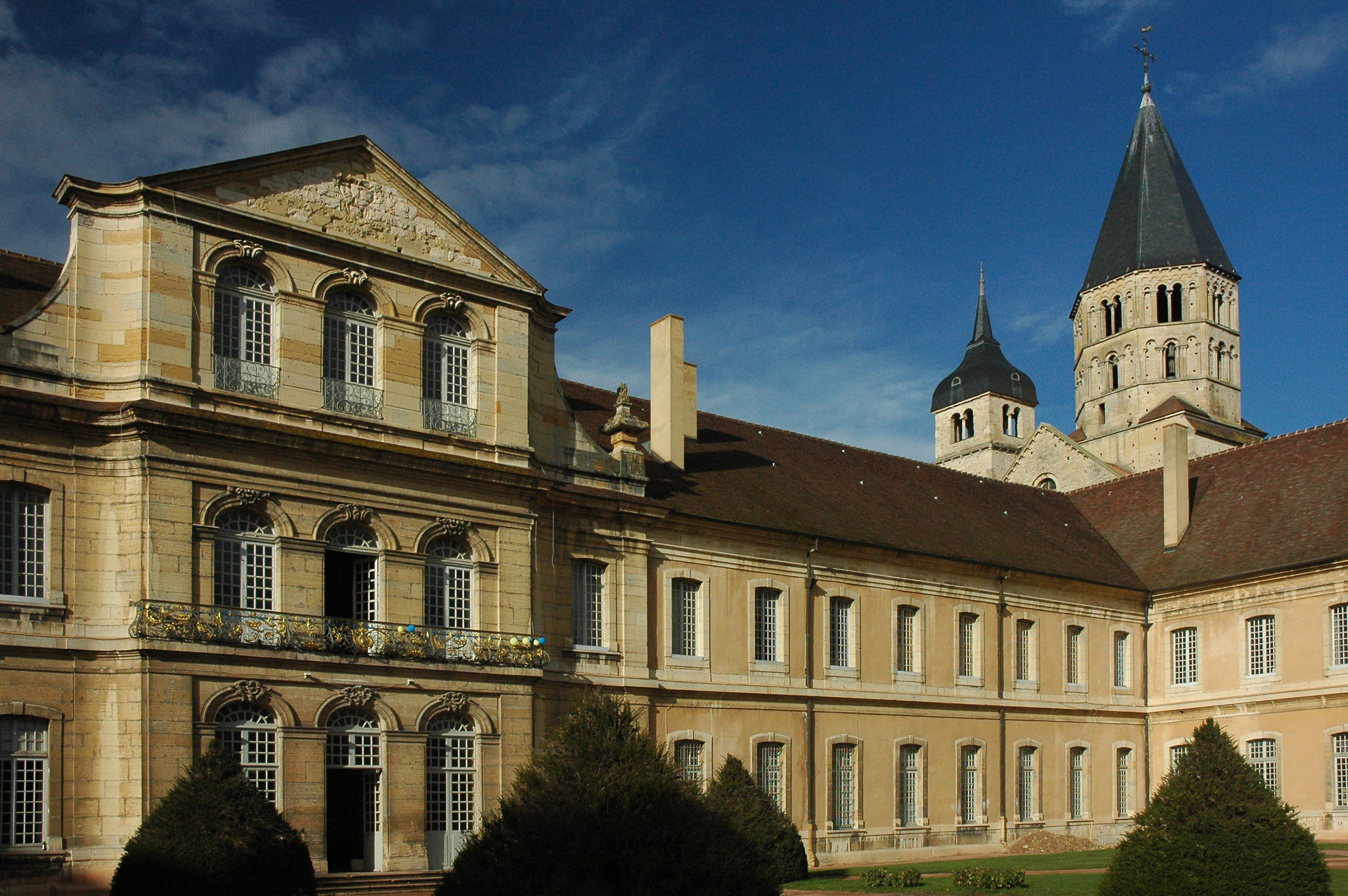
Cluny centre, view of the abbey (1891).

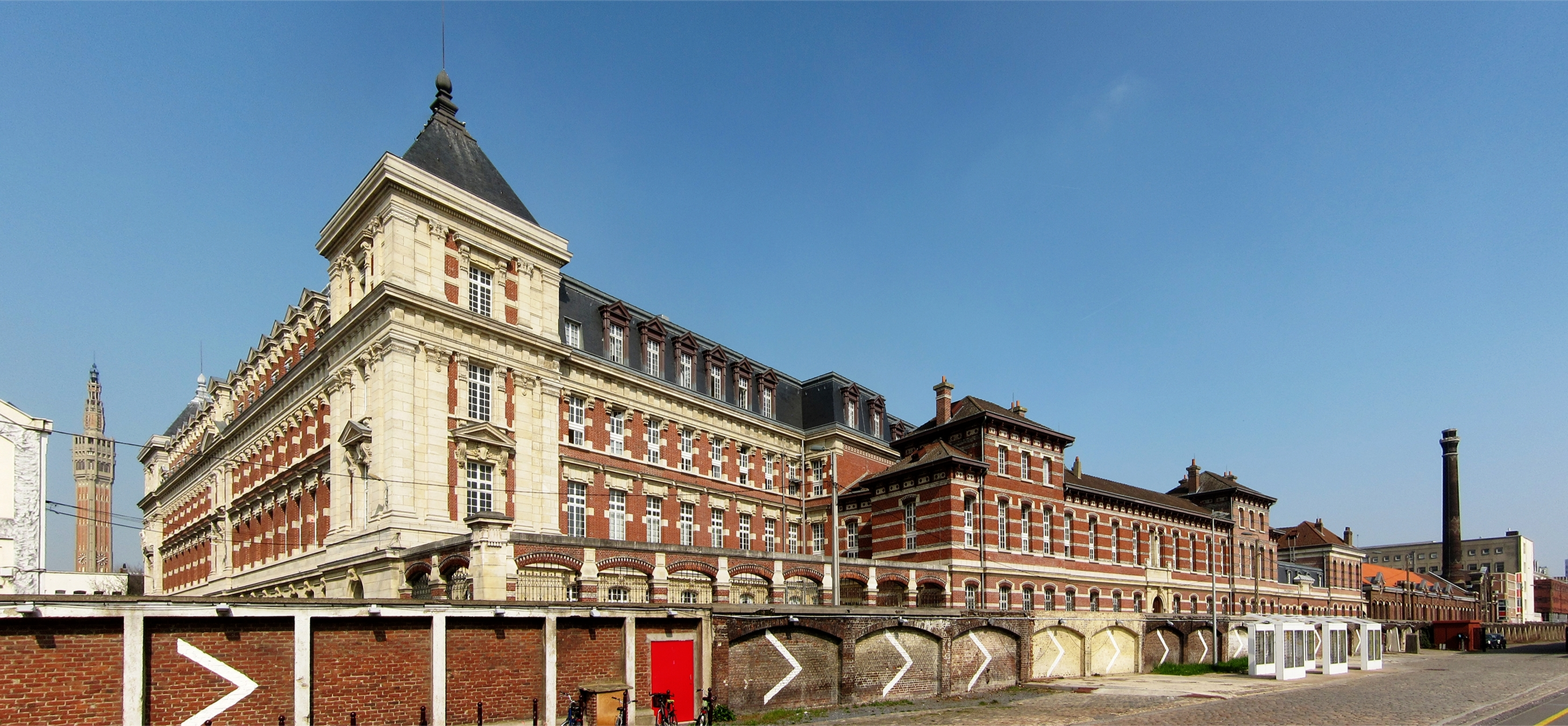
Lille centre (1900).

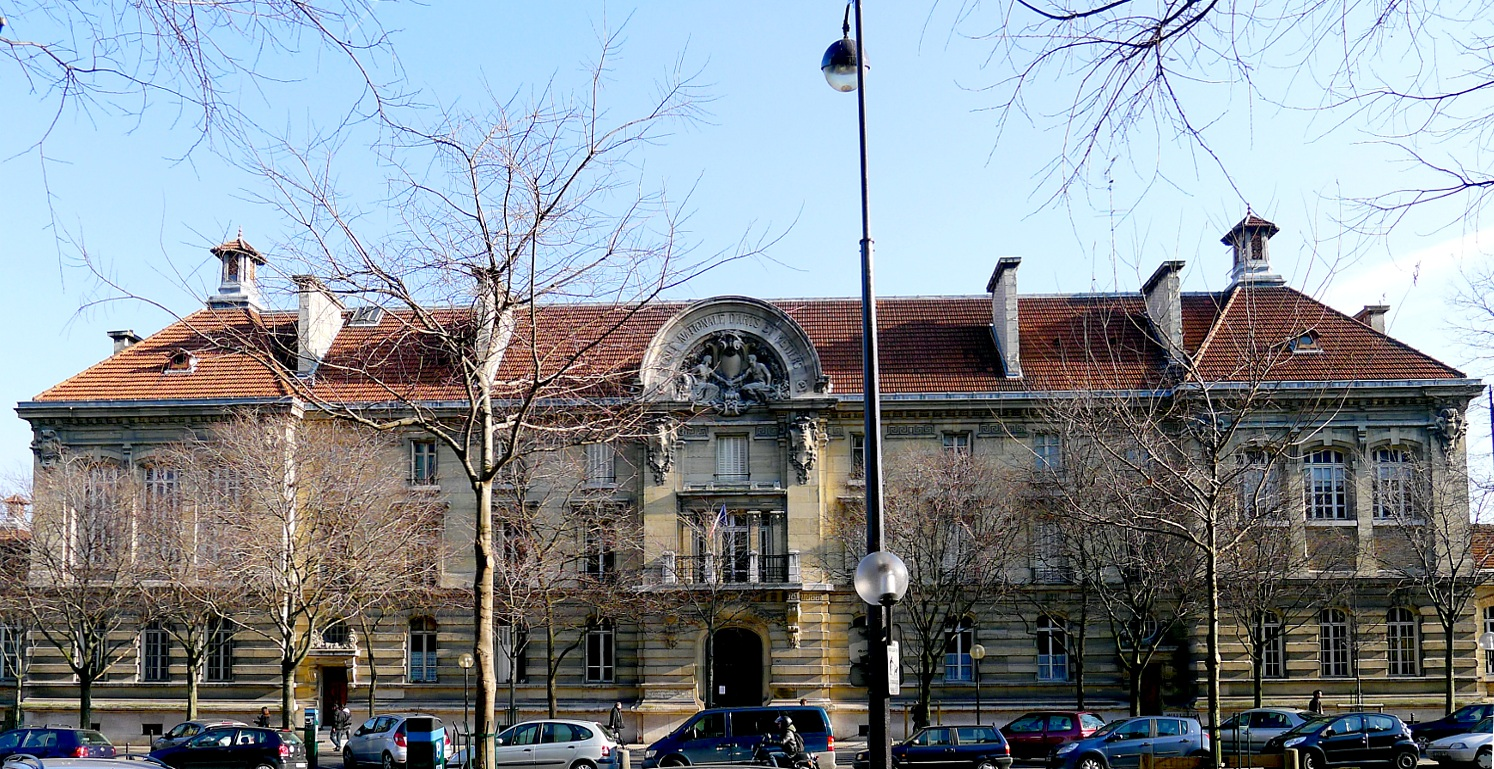
Main campus in Paris (1912).

=== Important dates ===
In 1817, the school's military status was removed by royal order and the official goal of the school was set to train qualified technicians. However, in practice, the organisation remained military and the students continued to wear the uniform. This tradition continues today. In 1826, a second royal order confirmed this new status, and the military organisation was fully removed. The students were granted the right to wear the uniform as a civil one. After a third attempt, the students gained the right to form an association of the Arts et Métiers alumni in 1847. The regional campuses were transformed into engineer training institutions in 1907. In 1963, the curriculum was modified in order to recruit new students from the Classes préparatoires. In 1964, Nicole Laroche became the first woman enrolled at the Arts et Métiers. The school became a grande école in 1976 and received the EPSCP status in 1990.

In 2007, the school created the PRES ParisTech and adopted the brand name "Arts et Métiers ParisTech" and no longer uses "ENSAM" in its publications, until removing the mention of «ParisTech» from its logo in 2016.

=== Logos and symbols ===
At the beginning of its history, the school did not have a proper logo, but shared its blazon with the Duke and the city of Liancourt. On the bottom-left of the blazon, the letters A and M are written on the inside of a gear, over a red background. With the different regimes and the different names of the eightieth and ninetieth centuries, the visual identity of the school was not defined properly. First it adopted the imperial eagle as a symbol, when Napoléon Bonaparte was in authority, then it was replaced by a royal flower to greet the return of the monarchy. Eventually the students decided to create their own symbol and keep it regardless of the status quo. This symbol originally represented interlocking capital A and M, inspired by the blazon of Liancourt. It is still used today by the students, but it evolved slightly to a smoother version in the 1950s. The alumni association first logo was also inspired by the blazon of Liancourt (A&M, gear), but later adopted the students' version.

In 1963, a modern logo was designed for the school, completely different from what was known so far, but it kept the letters A and M. In 2007, with the creation of ParisTech, the school decided to create a brand new logo. This time the letters are not written anymore, but they can be read on the contours of the purple and orange diamonds. The new brand name of the school is mentioned on the right of the diamonds.

Liancourt Blazon (1780–1799)

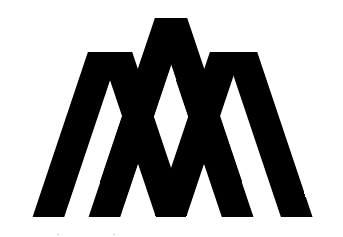
Students symbol (1800–today)

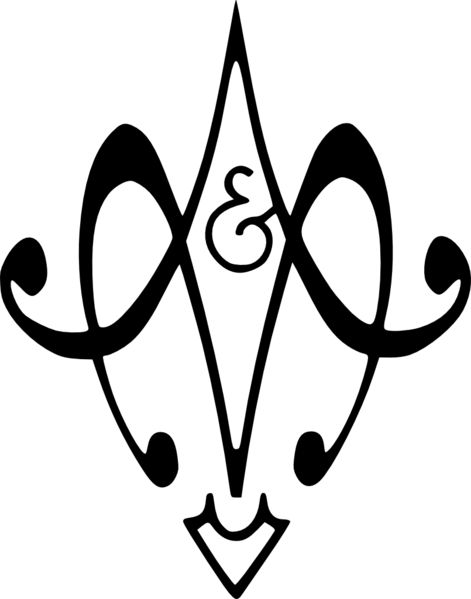
Students symbol (1950–today)

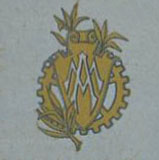
Alumni symbol in the eighteenth century

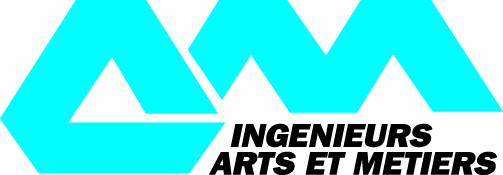
Logo from 1963 to 2007

Logo 2007 to 2019

Logo from 2019

== Rankings and figures ==
Whether speaking about starting salary, involvement in research or international opportunities, Arts et Métiers ParisTech has been consistently ranked among the top ten French engineering schools, along with other schools like Mines ParisTech, École polytechnique, CentraleSupélec or ENSTA Paris. It is even considered to be in the top 5 Grandes écoles recruiting students after classes préparatoires. The main figures are presented in the following lines:

- 1100 engineering degrees delivered each year (diplôme d'ingénieur = Master's degree in mechanical and industrial engineering)
- 6200 students
- 33000 alumni in the world
- 400 professors, 250 full-time researchers
- 200 industrial consultants
- 600 technicians and admins
- 15 labs and research teams
- 220 PhD students
- 125 million € global budget

National ranking (ranked for its Master of Sciences in Engineering)

Name	Year	Rank
DAUR Rankings	2022	34 ea

== Programs ==
The primary goal of Arts et Métiers ParisTech is to provide an initial foundation in general engineering principles for the disciplines of mechanical, structural, electrical and industrial engineering. Arts et Métiers ParisTech also offers continuing training for engineers and industry executives.

With 15 research laboratories and two PhD programs, Arts et Métiers ParisTech develops teaching and research activities in three main fields:

- Mechanics, materials, processes
- Fluids and energy systems
- Design, industrialization, risk management and decision-making

The school's training programs include about 24 Research-Based Masters and about 20 Advanced Masters programs and PhD studies.

=== Engineering curriculum: "Diplôme d'ingénieur" ===
Arts et Métiers ParisTech is renowned for its 3-year graduate engineering training that leads to the "diplôme d'ingénieur" degree, equivalent of a Master's degree of industrial and mechanical engineering.

==== Admission ====
Most of the annual 1100 candidates come from the Classes Préparatoires (CPGE), a two-year intensive programme of undergraduate studies in sciences. The national entry examination usually takes place in May. It consists of a written exam that lasts two weeks (Banque PT or CentraleSupelec), covering mathematics, physics, engineering sciences, literature and foreign languages. The applicants are then ranked nationally and the best ones are invited to attend oral exams in July. After this second phase, the applicants are sorted again to determine the final ranking. Only the top of this ranking is admitted to Arts et Métiers ParisTech. Occasionally, additional tests are requested if the candidate is considering a double-degree programme or a special curriculum.

Other ways of recruitment exist, sometimes those who have performed well in technical studies in lower-ranked colleges (DUT, University Technology Diploma or BTS, Higher Technician's Certificate) may be admitted. A special entrance exam is organized for these candidates and offers around 100 places.

It is also possible to apply after successfully completing a bachelor's degree or a master's degree in another university. Fifty candidates are admitted each year from the university system.

==== Curriculum ====
Each student spends at least three years in school. This time is usually extended with the choice of a special training, a stay abroad or an extra internship.

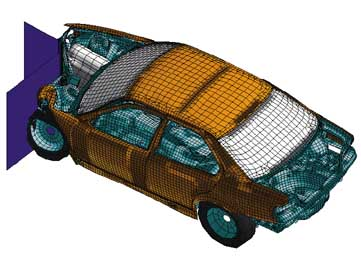
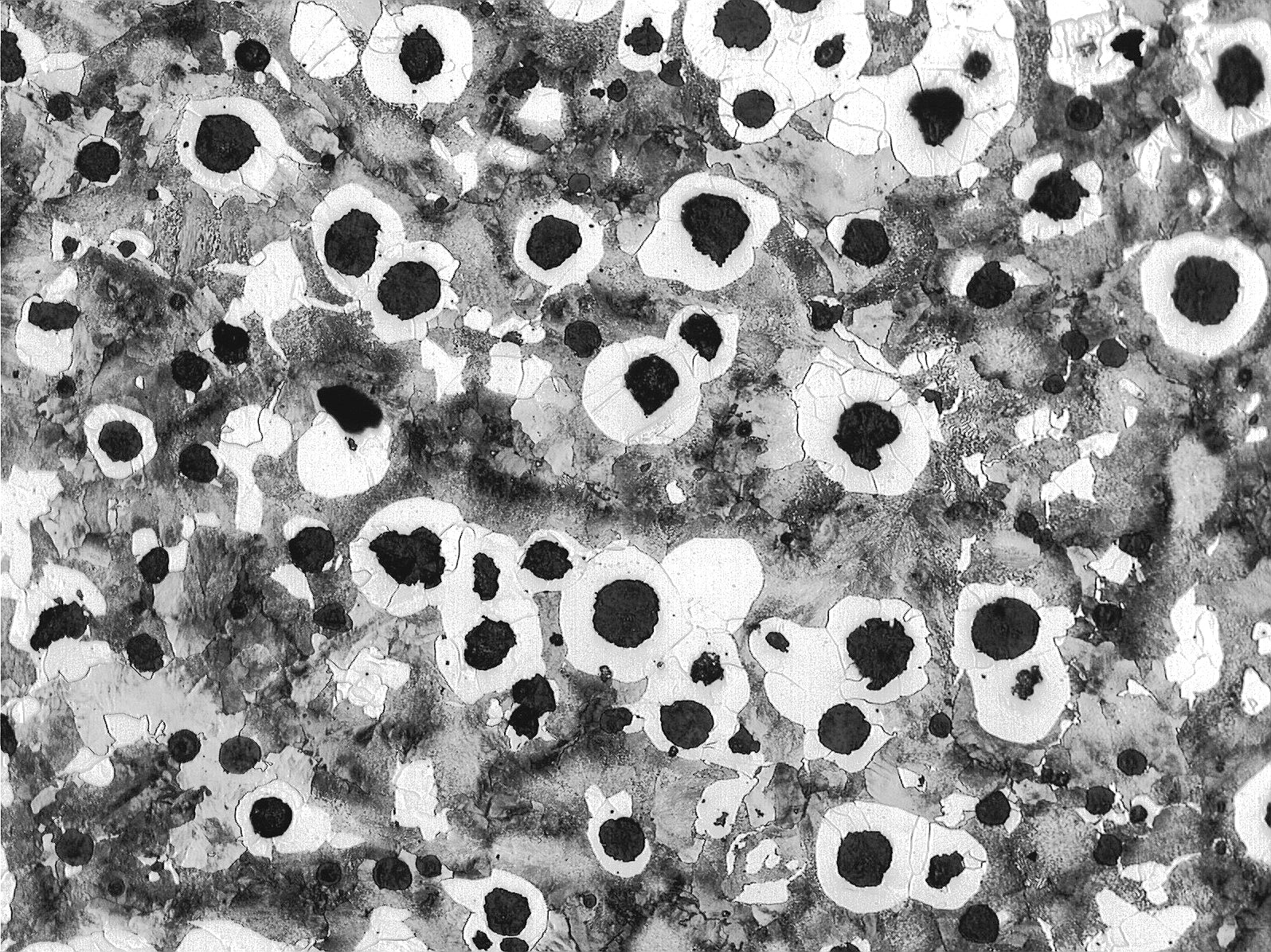
Numerical simulations, like the Finite Element Method and lab techniques, like metallography for materials science, are part of the curriculum of the Engineer Arts et Métiers.

The first 2 years are dedicated to a core curriculum covering all the fields of engineering:

- Mechanics
- Materials science
- Mechatronics
- Electrotechnics
- Process engineering: welding, forming, machining, casting
- Statistics
- Programming
- CAD and computer methods
- Fluid mechanics
- Thermodynamics
- Supply chain
- Systems and commands
- Power transmission and transformation
- Mechanical and industrial design

The training also includes management, finance and language courses. The third year is dedicated to specialised courses, such as sharp technical skills and good management basics.

During the three years, the students have to work on two big projects (one in first year, the other in second year) and have to complete three internships (as a labourer for one month, then as an engineering assistant for three months and then as a research engineer for six months).

==== The Arts et Métiers Engineer ====
Many Arts et Métiers engineers work for big companies (49.6% of the Gadzarts work in companies with 10000+ employees) and international groups (24% start their career abroad). Students also carry out projects and internships during their studies.

Since the gadzarts are versatile engineers, they work in all domains. The transportation industry (automotive, aerospace, rail, shipbuilding) is the largest employer of alumni, 24,1% of graduates work in this sector. The other industries are, in order of employed alumni: energy, consulting, civil engineering, IT and the remaining quarter is spread between finance, bioengineering and agri-food.

=== Master programs ===
The master programs are divided into two different groups: the Masters of Science that include graduate courses followed by a master's thesis (project of expertise) and the Advanced Masters, focused on a very specific field of science (equivalent to some professional degrees).

==== Master of Science ====
Among the 24 different MSc specialities, twenty are run exclusively by the school, two are offered in conjunction with the other member schools of ParisTech and two others with specific partnerships.

Area	Speciality
Design, Industrialization, Risk, Decision	Innovation, Design, Engineering • Design, production engineering and innovation • Virtual Engineering and Innovation • Digital Mock-up and 3D Visualization • Knowledge Integration in Mechanical Production • Product and production process design • Decision sciences and risk management • Fusion sciences (with INSTN) • Nuclear Energy (with ParisTech)
Fluids and Energy System	Energetics and Environment • Electrical engineering for sustainable development • Naval engineering • Fundamentals and applications of fluid mechanics • Mechanical science and engineering for energy, environment and transport • Nuclear Energy (with ParisTech)
Mechanics, Materials, Processes	Materials and engineering sciences in Paris Track (MAGIS) • Advanced Systems and Robotics • Materials and Surface Engineering • Mechanical and Energy Engineering • Mechanics, Materials, Structures and Processing Technology • Dynamics, Structures, Materials et Coupled Systems (with Centrale Paris)
Osteoarticular and Tissue Biomechanics	Biomaterials and Biological Materials • Impact and Injury Mechanisms • Muskulo Skeletal System

==== Advanced Masters ====
Among the seventeen different Advanced Masters, fifteen are run exclusively by the school, two are developed by specific partnerships.

Area	Speciality
Management	Eco-Design and Environmental Management • Managing Human Resources and International Mobility (with ENS) • Global Risk Management (with ESTP) • Managing Master Contracts • Maintenance Management • Management of Industrial Aeronautics Projects / Aeronautics Maintenance • Quality Management • Strategic Management of Change via Innovation • Technologies for Hybrid Electricity and Heat Production Systems, specialty: managing new energy sources • Integration of Quality, Health, Safety and Environment Management Systems • Lean: Production and Logistics
Energy and sustainable development	Sustainable Housing and Construction • Renewable Energy Sources and Their Production Systems • Electric Vehicle Engineering
Advanced sciences	Aeronautic and Spatial Engineering • Nuclear Safety • Advanced Virtual Spaces

=== Doctoral programs ===
The school offers two doctoral programs: the first one includes all the PhD specialities regarding physics, sciences and engineering, the other one includes all the PhD specialities regarding management, economy and social science.

==== School of engineering sciences ====
The doctoral school 432 is a partnership between Arts et Métiers ParisTech and Mines ParisTech. In 2013, 442 students were enrolled in its PhD programs (237 from Arts et Métiers). The 4 main fields of research are:

- Continuum mechanics, material sciences and processes (MSM)
- Fluid mechanics and energetics (MFE)
- Design and industrialization (CI)
- Mathematics and systems (MS)

The school is part of the two Carnot research institutes: Carnot Institute ARTS and M.I.N.E.S

==== School of management and decision ====
The doctoral school 471 is a partnership between Arts et Métiers ParisTech, HEC Paris and IAE Paris. In 2007, 127 students were enrolled in its PhD programmes. The main fields of research are:

- Theory and tools for management
- Performance and social responsibility in industrial companies
- Customer behavior and market organization

=== Bachelor of technology program ===
In 2014, Arts et Métiers was the first French engineering school to open a Bachelor of Technology program. 48 students were enrolled in the first class. The program aims to offer more possibilities to high school graduates that are interested in sciences but do not necessarily want to reach the diplôme d'ingénieur level.

== Academic partnerships ==
For over twenty years, the school has been developing opportunities for students to get double-degrees with French and international institutions. Students who wish to participle in these programmes are judged and selected according to their academic ranking during the first year of study.

=== Double-degree programs ===
The school created special partnerships with several institutes of technology worldwide to offer integrated double-degree programs to the students:

- USA: Georgia Tech (Georgia Institute of Technology)
- Germany: KIT (Karlsruhe Institute of Technology), Technische Universität Dresden
- Spain: Polytechnic University of Catalonia, Universidad Carlos III de Madrid
- Portugal: Universidade Técnica de Lisboa
- China: Shanghai Jiao-Tong University, Tongji University
- Sweden: KTH (Kungliga tekniska högskolan), University of Linkoping
- Canada: Polytechnique Montréal (Montréal Polytechnic), Université Laval
- Czech Republic: Brno University of Technology

In France, some special curriculums lead students to other degrees, along with their diplôme d'ingénieur. In the last two decades, the creation of ParisTech (the 12 best graduate schools in France) and héSam partnership with business schools, has created many opportunities. The most popular programs are with:

- Supélec (electrical engineering)
- IAE Paris (management and business administration)
- Polytechnique (military engineer)
- ESTP (civil engineering)
- IFP School (petroleum engineering)

=== International partnerships ===
The school has academic partnerships with over 190 universities. The students usually spend 1–2 semesters abroad in their third year. Partners on six continents include: Tsinghua University, MIT, Indian Institute of Technology, Kanpur(IITK), Tokyo Institute of Technology, Imperial College London, University of Bristol, Instituto Tecnológico y de Estudios Superiores de Monterrey, Politecnico di Milano, University of California, Berkeley, University of Queensland ...

== Student life ==
=== Traditions ===
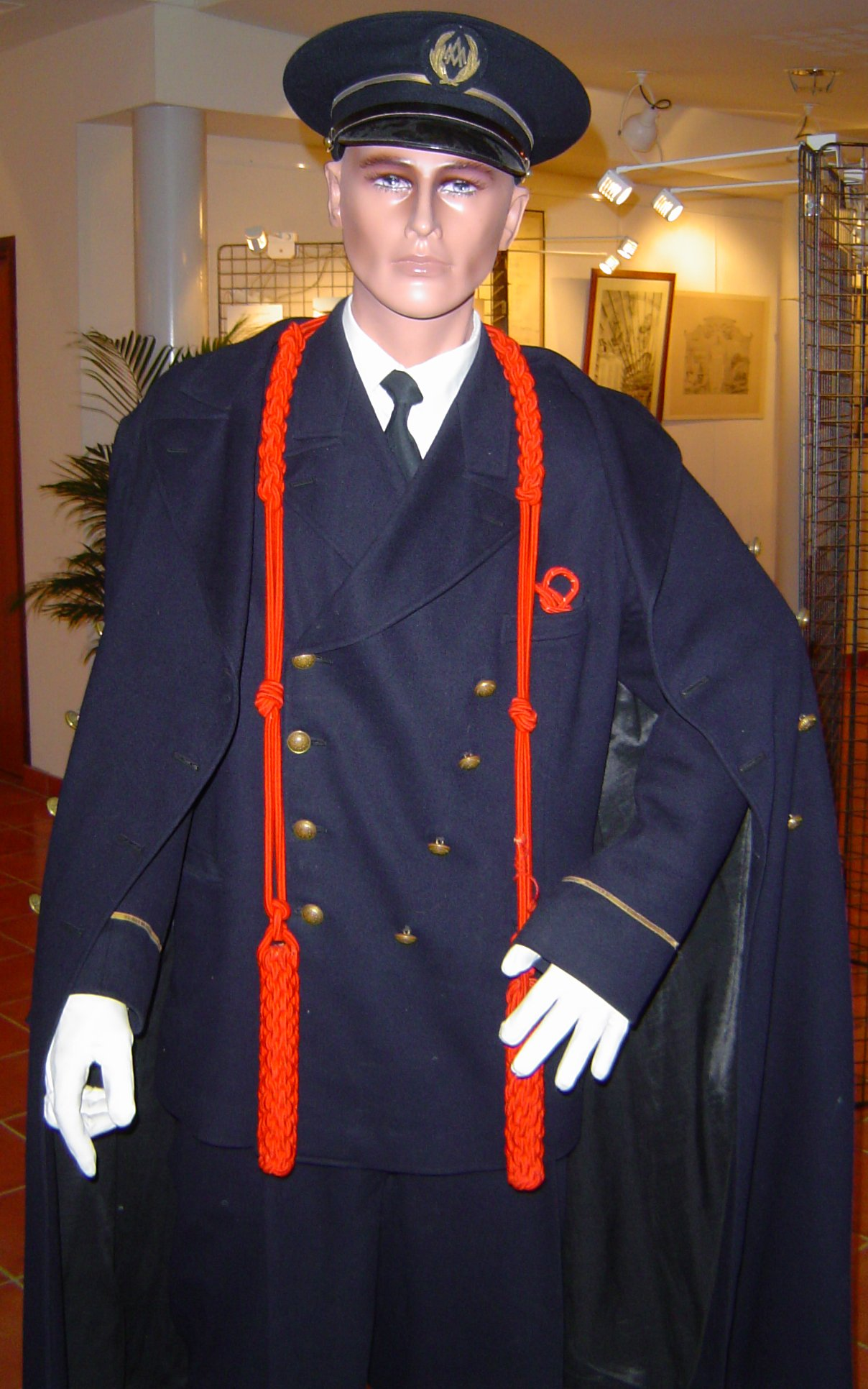
Uniform of the Gadzarts

Since its inception, the students perpetuate their own traditions and folklore, and are members of a student society. They call themselves "Gadz'Arts", abbreviated from "Gars des Arts" ("Guys from the Arts"). The "Gadz" folklore includes traditional clothing, language, songs and legends, related symbolism, and ceremonials. Gadz'Arts activities are independent of the administration of the school and are exclusively run by the students, although the two parts often cooperate for organising cultural or sporting events. Students still wear the uniform from the military past of the school.

=== Student clubs and activities ===
Each one of the eight campuses has its own student association (AE) and clubs, but they all follow a national scheme. Paris is the headquarters of the national student association (UE) and organizes all the global events. The UE is one of the biggest student associations in Europe, with 3500 active members and a budget of 3.5 million €. Each year, big events are organized:

- a national career fair in Paris: the Forum Arts et Métiers introduces 5000 students to 150 companies, offering full-time positions or internships.
- a two-week-long ski session called Skiozarts (SKZ), where 1500 Gadzarts meet on the slopes and overrun a ski resort in the French Alps, such as Val Thorens, l'Alpe d'Huez, les Arcs, Val d'Isère...
- a national student committee, organized each year in a different campus, where 1000 students meet, discuss and vote the big decisions concerning the UE.

Many clubs exist, in various domains, and the teams of each campus can cooperate or participate in external events (Shell Eco-Marathon, French Robotics Cup, Challenge of the automotive engineers). In the same way, each campus has its own sport teams. Once a year they compete against each other during the Olympic week.

=== Galas ===
The student associations organises several galas, in each campus as well as a national one in Paris:

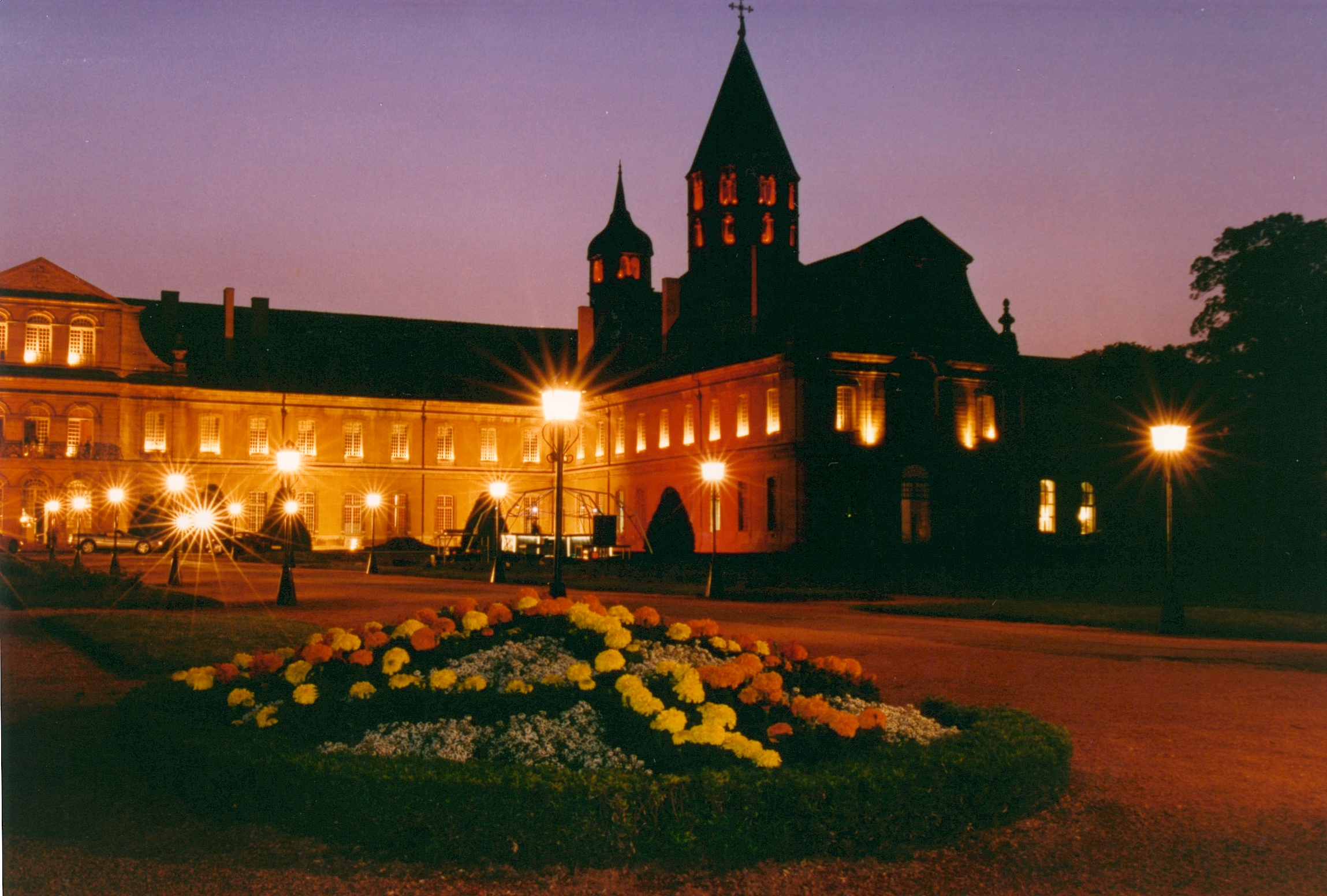
The abbey of Cluny during the gala

- Angers: twice a year
- Metz: once a year, 2000 guests
- Bordeaux: once a year, 3000 guests
- Cluny: once a year, 4000 guests
- Lille: once a year, 3000 guests
- Aix-en-Provence: 3 times a year, 5000 guests
- Chalons-en-Champagne: twice a year, 3000 guests

The National Grand Gala in Paris takes place in different buildings or monuments, depending on the year: the Eiffel Tower, Louvre Palace, the Palais Garnier, the Palace of Versailles... Thousands of guests, students and alumni meet, usually in May or June.

== Alumni ==
Logo Arts et Métiers Mag.

The 33000 members of the SOCE (society of the alumni) play an important role in the student life. The SOCE was created in 1846 and is the biggest circle of engineers in Europe. Even if the society is completely independent from the school, joint ventures are frequent, for research projects or feedback discussions. The members help students to start their career proposing jobs or internships, they also give some financial support to the ones that have special needs (e.g.: entrepreneurship, fees for a foreign country). The link between the SOCE and the UE is strong, and the alumni act as mentors but also as friends for the students. Weekly, monthly and annual meetings are organized and the student promotions are sponsored by the promotions +5, +25 and +50. The SOCE also manage the phone book, released every year, and the web directory, "Gadz.org". A magazine is published every month, called "Arts et Métiers Mag", addressed to students, alumni and professors.

Alumni include:

- Pierre Bézier (Paris, 1927), inventor of computer-aided design
- Paul Bizet (Aix, 1865), CEO of Compagnie Générale d'électricité (Alcatel-Lucent)
- Jean-Lou Chameau (Lille 1972), president of the California Institute of Technology
- Alain Charmeau, (Cluny, 1974), CEO of EADS Astrium Space Transportation
- Rene Fonck, World War I. Leading ace of French and Allied military aviation.
- Jean-François Dehecq (Lille, 1958), CEO of Sanofi Aventis
- Alexandru G. Golescu (Paris, 1839), Romanian politician
- Lucien Servanty, COO of the Concorde program
- Roland Vardanega (Cluny, 1961), former CEO of PSA Peugeot Citroën
- Henri Verneuil (Aix, 1940), Playwright and filmmaker
- Hubert de Malherbe (Paris, 1964), French Designer and head of Malherbe Paris

These names are extracts from the full article :

== Research labs ==
The 15 laboratories of Arts et Métiers ParisTech are spread in the teaching centres and research institutes. They are all part of the Carnot Institute ARTS and most of the laboratories are run in collaboration with local universities or research institutions. Together these laboratories raise 15.4 millions € a year with research contracts.

Laboratories of Arts et Métiers ParisTech
Name	Full name	City	Fields	Partnerships
DynFluid	Laboratory of fluid dynamics	Paris	Fluid dynamics, aero-acoustics, turbo-equipments.	
I2M	Institute of mechanics and engineering	Bordeaux	Mechanical engineering and physics applied to civil engineering and special materials (wood, concrete).	University of Bordeaux, ENSCBP, INRA
IRENav	Navy School research institute	Angers/Brest	Engineering and sciences in the fields of marine and submarine observation, modelisation and communications.	École navale
L2EP	Lille Laboratory of Electrical Engineering and Power Electronics	Lille	Electrical and material engineering. Application to piezoelectric materials, electrical networks and electromagnetism in materials.	
LABOMAP	Burgundy laboratory of material sciences and process	Cluny	High speed machining for special materials and complex shapes.	ECAM
LAMPA	Arts et Métiers ParisTech laboratory of Angers	Angers/Laval	Design of virtual reality systems and integration of navigation instruments.	
LBM	Laboratory of biomechanics	Paris	Biomechanics, medical tooling and digital observation of the human body.	
LCFC	Laboratory of design, manufacturing and control	Metz	Modelization and optimization of the Product-Process interactions applied to high performance products.	
LCPI	Laboratory of product design and innovation	Paris	Optimization of the design process, rapid prototyping, eco-friendly design	
LE2I	Laboratory of electronics and digital imaging	Chalon-sur-Saône/Cluny	Electronics and image engineering, enhanced virtual reality, digital environments	Université de Bourgogne
LEM3	Laboratory of Microstructure Studies and Mechanics of Materials	Metz	Micromechanics of smart materials applied to SMA and composite materials	University of Lorraine, ENIM
LML	Lille Laboratory of Mechanics	Lille	Fluid dynamics and hydro-acoustics applied to rotor systems	
LSIS–INSM	Laboratory of IT and systems	Aix-en-Provence/Lille	Analysis and modeling of multi-physics systems	Université de Marseille, Université de Toulon
MSMP	Laboratory of mechanics, surface, material sciences and process	Aix-en-Provence/Châlons-en-Champagne/Lille	Mechanical and industrial engineering applied to surface and interface studies	
PIMM	Laboratory of process, mechanical and material engineering	Paris	Material engineering applied to special processes (High power LASER)	CNAM

=== Industrial partnerships ===
==== Regular partners ====
Through its research activities, the school joins forces with industrial partners. The main associates are:

- Automotive: Renault, PSA, Valeo, Thyssen Krupp, Faurecia, General Motors, Bosch
- Aerospace: Airbus, Safran, Thales Group
- Electricity: EDF, Schneider Electric, Veolia, Bosch
- Rail: Alstom, SNCF
- Nuclear: AREVA, CEA
- Steel: ArcelorMittal, Nippon Steel
- Oil and Gas: Schlumberger, GDF SUEZ
- Chemistry: Arkema, Air Liquide
- Shipbuilding: DCNS
- Bio-Engineering: Sanofi
- IT: Gemalto, Thales Group

The school is also involved in doctoral programme agreements with the corporate universities of PSA and Safran. Special programmes have been developed to guide several engineers from the companies to a doctoral degree.

==== Aerospace initiatives ====
In the last two decades, the school has reinforced its links with the aerospace industry. It has taken part in numerous projects and groups across France.

- Aerospace Valley
- AM-69 Georges Payre
- Pegas PACA
- ASTech
- France AEROTECH
