= Gadzarts =

Gadz'Arts or Gadzarts is the nickname given to the students and the alumni of Arts et Métiers ParisTech (formerly École Nationale Supérieure d'Arts et Métiers - ENSAM), a prestigious university (grande ecole) specialised in engineering.

Since the beginning of the institution, the students of the school perpetuate their own traditions and folklore, and organise themselves in a student society or union. They call themselves "Gadz'Arts", abbreviated from "Gars des Arts" ("Guys from the Arts", the school's nickname is the "Arts"). The "Gadz" folklore includes traditional clothing, slang, songs and legends, related symbolism, and ceremonials.

Gadz'Arts activities are independent of the administration of the school and are exclusively run by the students and alumni, although the two parts often cooperate for organising cultural or sporting events.

== Traditions ==
The Gadz'Arts community is proud of its ancient traditions which are based on the values of mutual aid and fraternity as well as on the oral memory of numerous anecdotes and songs connected to the history of the school.

- In school, the pupils wear a lab coat (named a "biaude" in Argad'z language). It is traditionally grey for the first and second year students - white ones are reserved for those in their last year of study. Gadz'Arts customize their coats individually. The coats of the first year students are generally rather sombre and plain; whilst those of the second and third year students often have elaborate coloured motifs and drawings.
- Gadz'Arts also possess a uniform (nicknamed a 'Zag' in Argad'z), a nod to their military past. It is navy blue in colour and very close to the uniform of the officers of French Marine.
- When they enter the school, the students are given nickname, called a "bucque", that they use afterward in their relations with the other students and alumni.
- Each student is the "ancient" of one student of the following class and the "parrain" (or godfather) of one student of the class coming 25 years after. This creates continuity, which is the root of long term relations that last long after the students have left the school. It is called a family.
- One redundant and certainly the most important of gadz imagery/symbol is the square:
  - It is one of the most important instruments for a mechanical engineer.
  - It is a symbol for probity, a motto of the school's founder Duke of Rochefoucauld-Liancourt: "Helping with all that is useful, attaching his name to all that is right."
  - It refers to the alleged historical link between the school and Compagnons du Tour de France.

== Gadzarts slang ==
The Gadz'Arts use a special slang, called Argad'z which is actually a mix of French slang and military language, mixed with various local dialects.

In addition, words are often shortened and then get a final « s » or « z » sound and are prefixed with the syllable « za ». The vocabulary is varied among the different branches of the school.

The penmanship used is generally done so by hand in Gothic calligraphy-style letters for important occasions.

== Motto ==
The Gadz'Arts' motto is Fraternity:

Wherefore are those noble titles here?
Their false sheen shan't dazzle us.
O mighty ones, here dies inequity,
Old privileges, ye must perish to the last.
Friends, let us taste this happiness others scorn,
For recall well that within the School of Arts,
"Fraternity", such remains our motto,
Such it shall be for every true Gadz'Arts.

== Classes ==
School classes are named after:

- The ENSAM center it originates from;
- The last two digits of the year of admission.

For instance, students who entered the school in 1997, in Cluny are member of the Cluny 1997 or Cl 197 class. 197 is used instead of 97 to disambiguate from the 1897 class.

Center	Abbrev.
Châlons-en-Champagne	Ch
Angers	An
Aix-en-Provence	Ai or KIN
Cluny	Cl
Lille	Li
Paris	Pa
Bordeaux	Bo
Karlsruhe	Ka
Metz	Me

There have not been any classes from the Paris centre since the late 1940s.

Classes usually create an association to organise the students when they leave school. Some classes also choose an association name that differs from their usual designation.

Finally, all the classes of the same year, in all centres, are given a unique name by the Alumni Society. For instance, the 1982 classes have been given the name "Louis Delâge".

In 1964, Nicole Laroche became the first woman Gadzart, and her Zag uniform was designed for her by designer Jacques Esterel, himself an earlier graduate (Cl. 35).

To see the list of the famous Gadzarts see:
