= Nicole Laroche =

French engineer (1945–2019)

- Born: Nicole Schrottenloher; 20 July 1945
- Died: 28 May 2019 (aged 73)
- Occupation: Engineer
- Known for: First female Gadzarts

Nicole Laroche (née Schrottenloher) (20 July 1945 – 28 May 2019) was a French engineer. In 1964, she became the first female Gadzarts, the nickname given to students attending the École nationale supérieure d'arts et métiers (ENSAM) engineering grande ecole.

In 2026 she was named as one of the 72 women to have their names engraved on the Eiffel Tower.

== Early life and education ==
Nicole Christiane Schrottenloher was born on 20 July 1945 in the 18th arrondissement of Paris to a family of modest means, her father was a bakery worker. She passed the entry examination for the École nationale supérieure d'arts et métiers (ENSAM) in 1964. She was the first female student to enter the school, and her admission to ENSAM received extensive media coverage.

== First female Gadzarts engineer ==
In 1964 Nicole Schrottenloher became the first woman Gadzarts, the nickname given to students attending the Arts et Métiers ParisTech (formerly the École Nationale Supérieure d'Arts et Métiers - often abbreviated to ENSAM), a grande ecole (university) specialised in engineering. Her entry into ENSAM was the subject of significant media attention. The Gadzarts wear a formal navy blue uniform, nicknamed a 'Zag', in a nod to the university's military foundation. As the first woman to join the college, it was decided that a women's uniform was required. It was designed for her by French designer Jacques Esterel, himself an earlier graduate of ENSAM (Cl. 35), who also designed uniforms for air crews and French Olympic teams in the 1960s.

Schrottenloher was one of the first women to enter the leading French engineering schools: the first woman to be admitted to the École des ponts ParisTech had only been two years earlier in 1962. It took until 1970 for a woman to be admitted to Mines Paris – PSL and until 1972 for the École polytechnique to admit a woman. Anne-Marcelle Schrameck had graduated from l'École nationale supérieure des mines de Saint-Étienne in 1919, but remained the only woman to attend for 50 years as the rules were changed to exclude female students after her.

Schrottenloher entered the Lille class, classified as Class Li.64 in the ENSAM system. The living accommodation at the college was only designed for men, so Schrottenloher had to live in the town rather than the college which limited her presence at lessons and meals. The expenses were covered by a loan from the Soci (Alumni society), which she repaid in full as soon as she graduated to ensure that other students could benefit from future financial support. Her male classmates were supportive, and she made lifelong friends, but she was isolated at times, and the college experience wasn't particularly easy for her. Nicole Schrottenloher married Michel Laroche and used the name Nicole Laroche from then on.

She later shared her experience for a commemorative exhibition in 2015.

J'ai été reçue au concours. J'ai beaucoup hésité en apprenant que je serais la première et seule fille, mais jamais un Gadzarts n'a dû arrêter ses études pour des raisons financières. Cet argument a pesé dans mon choix d'intégrer l'Ecole Nationale des Arts et Métiers. (I passed the competitive entrance exam. I was very hesitant when I found out that I would be the first and only girl, but no Gadzarts has ever had to stop studying for financial reasons. This argument weighed heavily in my decision to enter the Ecole Nationale des Arts et Métiers.)

— Quote from 50 Portraits 50 ans d'ingénieures Arts & Métiers (SOCE, Paris 2015)

== Career ==
Nicole Laroche began her career in the sales department of a steel equipment company for a few months. She was soon earning double her father's salary. She then became coordinator of design and methods for an automotive subcontractor, a position she held for 4 years before returning to college for further study. She obtained her engineering diploma from the Institut Français du Froid Industriel (IFFI) in 1975. Laroche worked as design manager for air conditioning in railway carriages for the next 14 years.

She then made a career change, taking the Ministry of National Education (France) exams to become a mathematics teacher at the Lycée Professionnel La Tournelle in La Garenne-Colombes, Hauts de Seine until her retirement. Laroche was supportive of women engineering students who followed in her footsteps and spoke of her experiences at events to encourage girls to consider engineering as a career.

== Awards ==
In 2014, Nicole Laroche was awarded the Médaille de Bronze by the société des Ingénieurs Arts et Métiers, the alumni association of Arts et Métiers ParisTech.

In 2026, Laroche was announced as one of 72 historical women in STEM whose names have been proposed to be added to the 72 men already celebrated on the Eiffel Tower. The plan was conceived by a student and tour guide named Bernard Rigaud and it was announced by the Mayor of Paris, Anne Hidalgo following the recommendations of a committee led by Isabelle Vauglin of Femmes et Sciences and Jean-François Martins, representing the operating company which runs the Eiffel Tower.

== Death ==
During her battle against cancer, Laroche enjoyed meeting up with her old classmates.

Nicole Laroche died on 28 May 2019 in Argenteuil, in the northwestern suburbs of Paris. She was survived by her husband and child.
