= Metz Science Park =

Science park in Metz, Lorraine, France

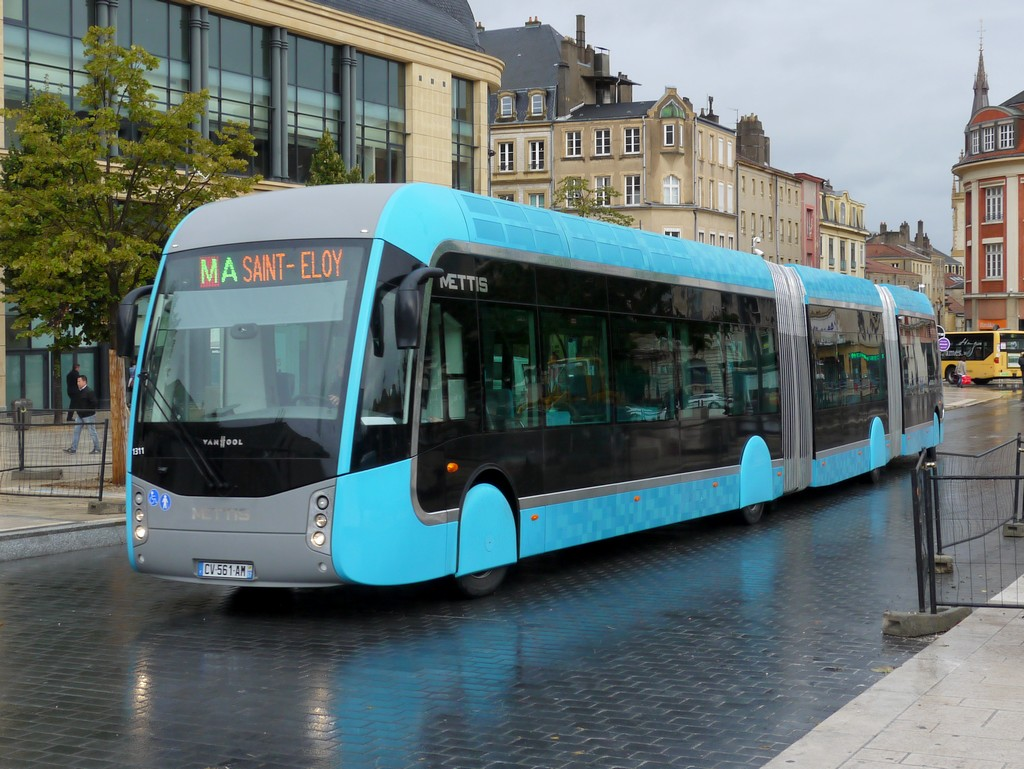
- METTIS rapid transit bus linking the park to the centre of Metz
- Interactive map of Metz Science Park
- Location: Metz, France
- Coordinates: 49.100°N 6.225°E
- Opening date: 1983; 43 years ago
- No. of tenants: 250
- No. of workers: 4,000

Metz Science Park is a French Science Park based in the South-East of the city of Metz, in the area of Grigy. It is the second largest technology center of Lorraine in terms of workforce, behind the science park of Nancy. There are more than 250 companies and 4,000 people working in the park.

== History ==
The park was created in 1983 by the former mayor of the city, Jean-Marie Rausch. The first name given to the park was "Technopôle Metz 2000". Then, it was renamed "Metz Technopôle" in 2002.

== Facilities ==
=== Transportation ===
The place being really close to Luxembourg, Germany and Belgium and having good transportation hubs, ithas been used for big events.

Since 2013, the bus rapid transit network, the METTIS, links the Science Park with the center of Metz.

=== Buildings ===
Important international facilities exist in the park :

- Metz International Congress Center
- World Trade Center
- Business center CESCOM

== Education ==
Many graduate schools are located in the park, especially engineering ones :

- Arts et Métiers ParisTech (ENSAM), engineering school in mechanical and industrial engineering
- École supérieure d’électricité (Supélec)
- Georgia Tech Europe, European campus of the Georgia Institute of Technology
- ESITC
- ENIM

The overall number of students, including the university of Lorraine and the high schools, is about 4500.

== Parks and recreation ==
The 18-hole golf course of Metz is in the middle of the Science Park. Many other green places are well maintained, especially around the lake Symphony and the lake Ariane.
