= Cluny =

Commune in France

- Commune
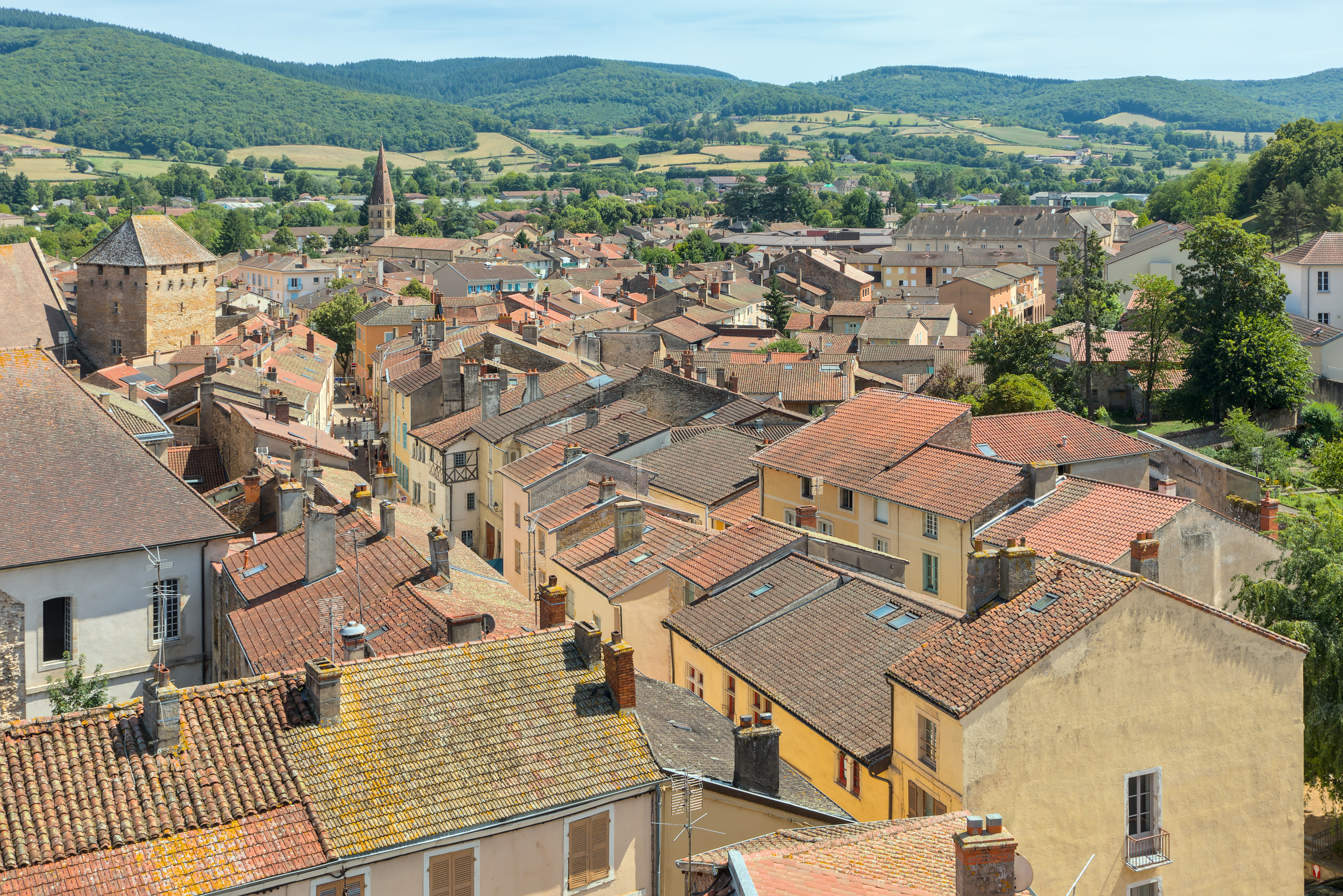
- The town center seen from the Tour des Fromages

- Coat of arms
- Location of Cluny
- Location within France Location within Bourgogne-Franche-Comté
- Coordinates: 46°26′07″N 4°39′36″E
- Country: France
- Region: Bourgogne-Franche-Comté
- Department: Saône-et-Loire
- Arrondissement: Mâcon
- Canton: Cluny
- Intercommunality: Clunisois

Government
  - Mayor (2026–32): Jean-François Demongeot
- Area^{1}: 23.71 km^{2} (9.15 sq mi)
- Elevation: 248 m (814 ft)
- Highest elevation: 574 m (1,883 ft)
- Lowest elevation: 226 m (741 ft)
- Population (2023): 4,942
  - Density: 208.4/km^{2} (539.8/sq mi)
- Time zone: UTC+01:00 (CET)
  - Summer (DST): UTC+02:00 (CEST)
- INSEE/Postal code: 71137 /71250
- ^{1} French Land Register data, which excludes lakes, ponds, glaciers > 1 km^{2} (0.386 sq mi or 247 acres) and river estuaries.

Cluny (French pronunciation: [klyni]) is a commune in the eastern French department of Saône-et-Loire, in the region of Bourgogne-Franche-Comté. It is 20 km (12 mi) northwest of Mâcon.

The town grew up around the Benedictine Abbey of Cluny, founded by Duke William I of Aquitaine in 910. The height of Cluniac influence was from the second half of the 10th century through the early 12th. The abbey was sacked by the Huguenots in 1562, and many of its valuable manuscripts were destroyed or removed. Part of the abbey church and monastic buildings survived destruction as a result of the French Revolution.

== Geography ==
The river Grosne flows northward through the commune and crosses the town.

== Population ==
Historical population
Year	Pop.	±% p.a.
1968	3,807	—
1975	4,343	+1.90%
1982	4,441	+0.32%
1990	4,430	−0.03%
1999	4,376	−0.14%
2007	4,585	+0.58%
2012	4,712	+0.55%
2017	4,830	+0.50%
2023	4,942	+0.38%
Source: INSEE

== See also ==
- Cluniac Reforms
- Communes of the Saône-et-Loire department
