= The Spring Bintulu =

Shopping mall in Bintulu, Sarawak, Malaysia

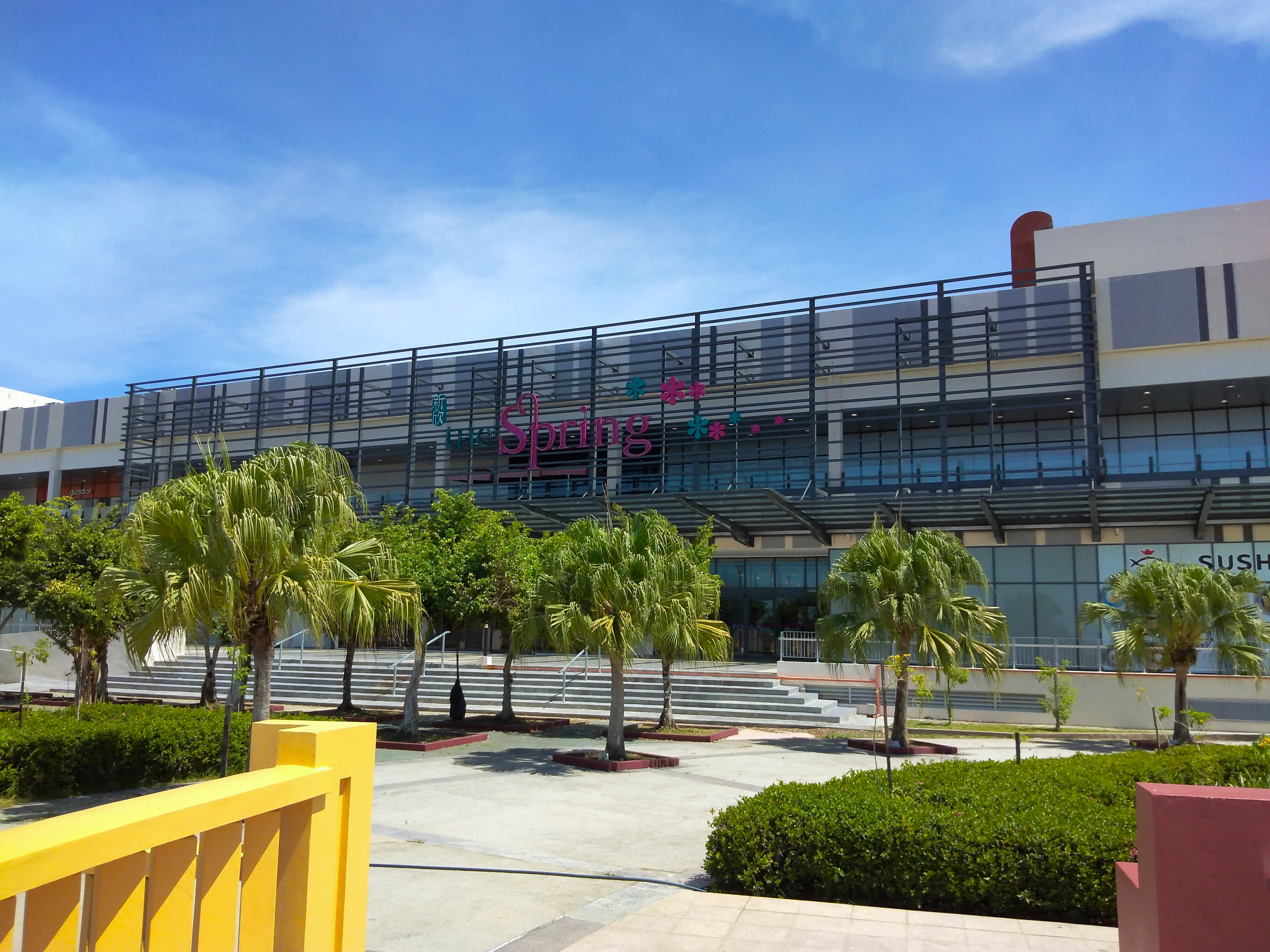
- Location: Lot 4282, Jalan Tun Abdul Razak, Bintulu, Bintulu Division, Sarawak, Malaysia
- Coordinates: 3.180925°N 113.034380°E
- Opened: 18 January 2019; 7 years ago
- Manager: The Spring Management Services
- Owner: Parkcity The Spring (Bintulu) Sdn. Bhd.
- Num. of stores: 57
- Num. of anchor tenants: 3 (H&M, Parkson, Ta Kiong Supermarket)
- Floor area: 390,000 sq ft (36,000 m^{2})
- Floors: 3
- Website: thespring.com.my/btumain

The Spring Bintulu is a shopping mall in Bintulu, Bintulu Division, Sarawak, Malaysia. Located at Jalan Tun Abdul Razak, it was scheduled to be opened in November 2018 but only did so in January 2019. It has three anchor tenants which are H&M, Parkson and Ta Kiong Supermarket.

tHe Spring Bintulu has the capacity to house 127 shopping outlets spread out over two floors. It also offers a seafront esplanade for major mall events, a food court with 686 seats and a vantage point which offers a panoramic view of the South China Sea from the alfresco area.

== Retail outlets ==
Aside from its main anchor tenants, tHe Spring Bintulu contains a variety of international brands. These include footwear giants including Bata Shoes, Hush Puppies and Skechers, fashion brands such as Giordano, Levi's, Pierre Cardin and Uniqlo, sportswear brands like Adidas, New Balance, Nike, Puma and Under Armour, cosmetics brands like The Face Shop and The Body Shop, chain stores such as Sasa, Guardian and Watsons, electronics companies like Switch (Apple store), Huawei, Xiaomi, OPPO, VIVO and PC Image (IT store), telecommunications firms such as Digi and Maxis, and the book store Popular, and also home improvement retailer MR.DIY, MR.TOY and MR.DOLLAR, and the first GSC Cinema in Bintulu opened on 24 December 2022.

In addition, several cafes and food stalls can be found inside the Spring Bintulu, including KFC, Seoul Chicken, Starbucks, Sushi King, Tealive and Sharetea. Some of its restaurants are notably arranged along an outdoor alfresco space.

== Entertainment ==
The current cinemas in Bintulu are Ashtar Galactic Cinema(Commerce Square Bintulu) and TGV Cinemas(Boulevard Shopping Mall Bintulu). In the beginning MBO Cinemas was expected to become a tenant of The Spring Bintulu by the end of 2019, but might probably switch to Golden Screen Cinemas due to The Spring Kuching directory.

== Location ==
tHe Spring Bintulu is situated in between Parkcity Everly Hotel, Parkcity Mall Bintulu and Crown Pacific Mall(estimate to be operated in year 2023). It also lies at the river mouth of the Kemena River, where it debouches into the South China Sea.

== See also ==
- List of shopping malls in Malaysia
