= Golden Screen Cinemas =

Malaysian cinema chain

- Rebranded Logo since 2019, which replaced the full cinema name with its acronyms.

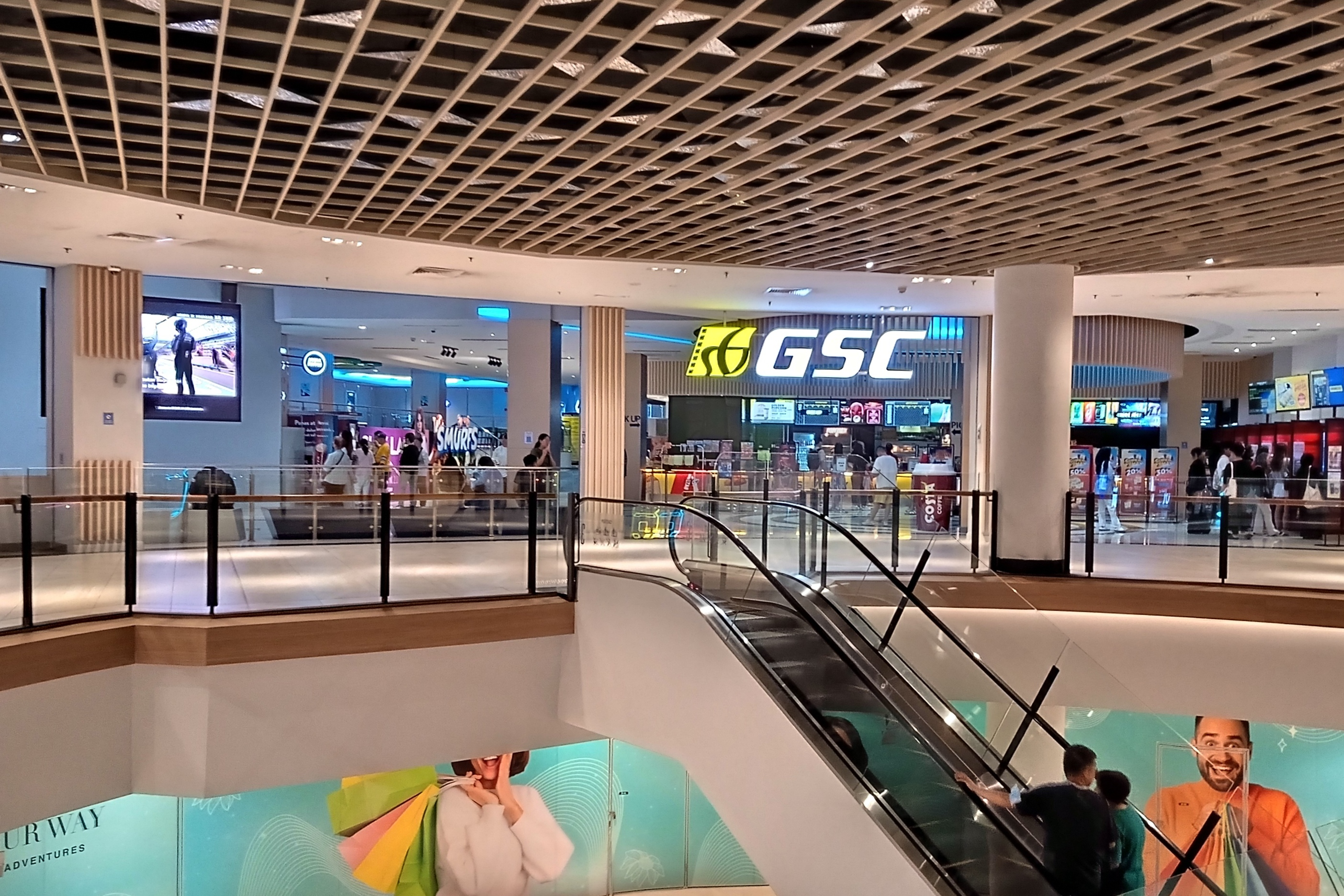
- A Golden Screen Cinemas branch at IOI Mall Damansara in Kota Damansara.
- Trade name: Golden Screen Cinemas Sdn. Bhd.
- Type: Private Limited Company
- Industry: Media, cinemas, marketing, distribution
- Founded: 1 April 1987; 39 years ago
- Headquarters: Petaling Jaya, Selangor, Malaysia
- Key people: Koh Mei Lee (CEO)
- Products: Aurum Theater, Jin Gastrobar, GSC Movies, GSC Lite, Velvet Cinemas, Happy Food Co.
- Number of employees: 5000+ Employees
- Parent: PPB Group
- Website: gsc.com.my

Golden Screen Cinemas Sdn. Bhd. (GSC) is Malaysia's largest cinema exhibitor and a wholly owned subsidiary of PPB Group Berhad (a member of the Kuok Group), which is an exhibitor and distributor of movies and content in Malaysia. It operates over 600 screens in 70 locations across Malaysia and Vietnam, with 504 screens in 55 locations in Malaysia, and 108 screens in 18 locations in Vietnam through a partnership with Galaxy Studio.

== History ==
=== Establishment of Golden Communications Circuit (1987–1990) ===
Golden Screen was founded on 1 April 1987 under the name of Golden Communications Circuit, a joint venture between Hong Kong's Golden Harvest (from which it inherited the studio's iconic Big "G" logo) and the Malaysian Bumiputera conglomerate PPB Group (then Perlis Plantations), the latter of whom operated a small set of Malaysian cinemas leased from Shaw Brothers Studio. There were in the beginning 30 cinemas covering all Malaysia's major cities and towns, and at the time, Golden Harvest and Perlis Plantations owned respectively 70 and 30 percent of the stakes in the joint venture.

The films at that time were showcased in three languages: Malay, English and Chinese, with Golden Harvest in-house films forming majority of the shown movies. The English movies on the other hand were mostly of Hollywood origin, with some exceptions from European Countries.

=== Acquisition of Cathay Cinemas by Perlis Plantations Berhad (1990–1998) ===
In June 1990, Perlis Plantations Berhad expanded its entertainment portfolio by acquiring stakes in the Borneo Filem Organisation Sdn Bhd (BFO) from the State Government of Sabah, which later restructured as Cathay Cinemas Sdn Bhd. This strategic purchase brought the Malaysian operations of 33 Cathay Organisation and 33 Golden Communications Cinemas under the same corporate umbrella.

Control of the newly acquired cinema, which was 66.2 percent owned by Cathay Cinemas and the rest by Permodalan Nasional Berhad assumed in October the same year, resulting in termination of services of between 20 to 30 of its employees.

By 1991 however, the shares of Perlis Plantations in Golden Communications had shrunk to just 58.6 per cent to allow investment from other shareholders, while Golden Harvest own the remaining 27 per cent.

On 7 July 1994, Cathay Cinemas signed a joint venture agreement with United Artist Theatre and Wilton Group to expand the cinema network in Malaysia and abroad, forming a joint venture named Premier Cinemas Sdn Bhd.

In 1997, Perlis Plantations restructured its cinemas and leisure operations by injecting Golden Communications Assets into that of Cathay Cinemas Sdn Bhd, creating a new business entity called PPB Leisure Holdings Sdn Bhd. By that time, Cathay cinemas owned the largest chain of cinemas in Malaysia, totaling 47 of them when accounting Premier Cinemas and Cathay Organisation operations.

=== Brand merger and consolidation into Golden Screen Cinemas and opening of first flagship cineplex (1998–2003) ===
On 17 January 1998, Golden Communications (GC) Circuit and the Malaysian branch of Cathay Organisation were officially merged and consolidated into one major brand: Golden Screen Cinemas. The newly established cinema chain had 30 cinemas nationwide at the time.

On 2 December 1999, GSC opened the Asia' largest multiplex with 18 Screens - GSC Mid Valley at Mid Valley Megamall. To celebrate this momentous occasion, it gave away 18 local and international movie tickets for free during its one-week Movie Marathon Campaign, with those patrons completed their rounds of all movie watching offered grand prizes like trip to selected tourist destinations, season pass and T-shirts. That very same date, the International Screens concept was introduced at the all-new Mid Valley Branch to distribute highly acclaimed international movies from places like Hong Kong and Hollywood.

On 12 January 2000, Malaysia Book of Records under management of Director Danny Ooi recognised the Mid Valley multiplex as the largest in the country and awarded the title to the cinema chain. The opening of the cinema resulted in the closure of the smaller GSC Bangsar Shopping Centre with two halls originally opened in late November 1995 under the Golden Communications (GC) banner.

Under PPB Group Leisure subsidiary, losses of the cinema chain have been reduced to RM5.8 million for year 2001 (compared to RM9.7 million in 2000) on a turnover of RM60.3 million (compared to RM59.0 million in 2000) due to diligent cost cutting programme and closure of nonprofitable screens. The standardisation of the entertainment tax rate at 25% effective 1 October 2001 has also enabled the cinema operations to reduce its ticket prices and encourage more patrons. In 2002, the cinema chain managed to turn around to record a pre-tax profit of RM2.75 million (2001: pre-tax loss of RM6.41 million) against a turnover of RM73.68 million (2001: RM55.05 million). Buoyed by further supply of quality films (mainly blockbusters from home as well as abroad like Hollywood), GSC registered a significant growth in pre-tax profit to achieve RM9.02 million against a turnover of RM87.75 million in 2003.

As shopping-mall-based cineplex drew larger crowds in the early 2000s, smaller multiplexes and standalone cinemas began to shut down and consolidate their operations with larger branches. By the end of 2003, there were 16 locations of GSC cineplexes nationwide with a total of 86 halls covering nine states and federal territories – Kedah, Kuala Lumpur, Perak, Johor, Pahang, Sabah, Malacca, Penang, and Negeri Sembilan.

At the same time, GSC continued to improve its customer service and successfully launched its intelligent short message (iSMS) service for tickets reservation.

=== Expansion into Penang and opening of new cineplexes (2004–2006) ===
On 11 December 2003, GSC added a second cinema outlet in Penang post-Cathay merger with the launch of a RM18 million 12-screen multiplex at Gurney Plaza in George Town. With more than 1,800 seats at that time, it became the largest cinema in the state as well as in northern Malaysia.

Going further, GSC opened its 9-screen cineplex at Berjaya Times Square, Kuala Lumpur in January 2005. In July 2005, GSC opened its 13-screen cineplex at 1 Utama (New Wing), Petaling Jaya which offers THX halls, a 30-seater Gold Class, International Screens as well as special facilities such as ramps and a hydraulic lift for wheelchair-bound patrons. These added the number of GSC branches to 18.

Within this period, GSC recorded a 19% increase in pre-tax profit of RM10.73 million against a turnover of RM104.24 million in 2004, followed by record profits of RM17.96 million, with increase of 51.4% (2004 : RM11.86 million) against a higher revenue of RM120.28 million in 2005 and RM18.9 million against revenue of RM124.8 million in 2006.

=== Stakes acquisition from Golden Harvest and further expansion of cineplexes (2007–) ===
On 28 November 2006, PPB Leisure Holdings Sdn Bhd (PPBL) entered into a Share Sale and Separation Agreement (SSSA) with Golden Harvest Film Distribution Holding Limited (GH) to acquire GH’s entire 40.2% equity interest in GSC at a total cash consideration of RM91 million. The SSSA was completed on 28 February 2007, increasing PPB group's 54.2% stake in GSC to 94.4%.

In 2007, four more multiplexes were opened in Penang and Kuala Lumpur major shopping malls: Queensbay Mall George Town on 25 January 2007 with 8 halls, Sunway Carnival Mall Seberang Perai on 4 October 2007 with 8 halls, Pavilion Kuala Lumpur on 29 November 2007 with 13 halls and GSC Signature The Gardens Kuala Lumpur on 6 December 2007 with 7 halls. This increased the number of GSC Cinemas to 21.

The newly opened GSC Signature at The Gardens, Mid Valley is recognised as the first boutique cinema in Malaysia at that time, which offers only Gold Class and Premiere Class halls for premium movie viewing experience.

On 1 April 2007, GSC celebrates its 20th anniversary.

In June 2007, GSC added Maybank2u.com as the second option for customers to pay their movie tickets online via Maybank direct debit service.

With the newly-opened GSC Sunway Carnival Seberang Jaya effectively drawing a large number of moviegoers from the immediate and neighbouring areas in Seberang Perai, the 3-hall-strong GSC Summit Bukit Mertajam ceased operations on 18 February 2008.

== Locations ==
GSC is present in all states and territories of Malaysia except in Labuan and Kelantan, the latter of which has banned cinema within the state since 1990.

=== Johor ===
Cinema	Total Halls	Seats	Location	Remarks
AEON Mall Bandar Dato' Onn	5	658	Johor Bahru	Features GSC Big and Play+
KSL City Mall	8	1,378	Johor Bahru	Features D-BOX and GSC BIG
Kluang Mall	6	933	Kluang	
Heritage Mall	7	1,043	Kota Tinggi	
Paradigm Mall Johor Bahru	17	2,137	Johor Bahru	Features 2 Premiere Class Halls, 4DX Hall, D-BOX, Dolby ATMOS and IMAX Hall
Square One Shopping Mall	8	1,135	Batu Pahat	Features GSC Play
Sunway Big Box Retail Park	8	1,500	Iskandar Puteri	Features GSC Play+
Mid Valley Southkey	19	1,686	Johor Bahru	Features GSC's first IMAX Hall, 4DX, D-BOX, SkyBox, Dolby ATMOS, Play+ and Aurum Theatre
IOI Mall Kulai	6	640	Kulai	Featuring Play+

=== Kedah ===
Cinema	Total Halls	Seats	Location	Remarks
Aman Central	10	1,599	Alor Setar	
Amanjaya Mall	8	1,287	Sungai Petani	
Kulim Central	6	1,108	Kulim	

=== Kuala Lumpur ===
Cinema	Total Halls	Seats	Location	Remarks
EkoCheras Mall	9	1,161	Cheras	
Lotus's Kepong	7	1,066	Kepong	
Mid Valley Megamall	21	2,688	Mid Valley	Largest cinema in Malaysia. Features D-BOX, Dolby ATMOS, IMAX 3D and ONYX LED Screen
Melawati Mall	10	1,424	Melawati	Features Premiere Class, DOLBY ATMOS and DBOX
MyTOWN Shopping Centre	13	1,470	Cheras	Features GSC BIG, Premiere Class, Dolby ATMOS and D-BOX
NU Sentral	11	1,783	Brickfields	Features Dolby ATMOS
Quill City Mall	10	1,751	Kampung Baru	Features Dolby ATMOS
Setapak Central	7	1,020	Setapak	
The Gardens Mall	7	226	Mid Valley	Aurum Theatre (formerly GSC Signatures)
Mitsui Shopping Park LaLaport BBCC	12	1,282	Bukit Bintang	Features GSC BIG, DOLBY ATMOS and 4DX
KL East Mall	8	1058	Wangsa Maju	Features IMAX and PlayPark
Sunway 163 Mall	3	163	Mont Kiara	Velvet Cinemas, a boutique cinema outlet by GSC
The Exchange TRX	10	796	Tun Razak Exchange	Aurum Theatre - Features Getha Lux Suite, Comfort Cabin, Escape Studio, Screen X & IMAX 3D Hall
Rex Cinema	1	1,100	Petaling Street	Closed and repurposed to RexKL

=== Malacca ===
Cinema	Total Halls	Seats	Location	Remarks
AEON Mall Bandaraya Melaka	10	1,783	Malacca	Features D-BOX and Dolby ATMOS
Dataran Pahlawan Melaka Megamall	10	2,004	Malacca	Features D-BOX and Dolby ATMOS

=== Negeri Sembilan ===
Cinema	Total Halls	Seats	Location	Remarks
Palm Mall	10	1,660	Seremban	Features D-BOX

=== Pahang ===
Cinema	Total Halls	Seats	Location	Remarks
East Coast Mall	9	1,633	Kuantan	Features D-BOX and Dolby ATMOS
Kuantan City Mall	9	1,346	Kuantan	Features GSC Play and GSC BIG
Mentakab Mall	6	1,100	Mentakab	

=== Penang ===
Cinema	Total Halls	Seats	Location	Remarks
Queensbay Mall	8	1,528	Bayan Lepas	Features Dolby ATMOS
Gurney Plaza	12	1,617	George Town	Features D-BOX, Dolby ATMOS and Premiere Class
Sunway Carnival Mall	14	910	Seberang Jaya	Featuring Dolby ATMOS

=== Perak ===
Cinema	Total Halls	Seats	Location	Remarks
AEON Mall Falim	8	1,149	Ipoh	Features GSC Play
Ipoh Parade	12	2,000	Ipoh	Features D-BOX, Dolby ATMOS and GSC MAXX, 4DX

=== Perlis ===
Cinema	Total Halls	Seats	Location	Remarks
Kangar Jaya Mall	6	747	Kangar	Opened on 19 December 2025. Features GSC Play

=== Putrajaya ===
Cinema	Total Halls	Seats	Location	Remarks
IOI City Mall (West Wing)	13	2,047	Precinct 12	Features 4DX, D-BOX, Dolby ATMOS and GSC Maxx
IOI City Mall (East Wing)	13	4,000	Precinct 12	Located on Level 3 of East Wing. Features Play+, Premiere Class and IMAX Hall with IMAX Laser Projection.

=== Sabah ===
Cinema	Total Halls	Seats	Location	Remarks
1Borneo Hypermall	8	1,504	Kota Kinabalu	
Suria Sabah	8	1,471	Kota Kinabalu	Features D-BOX and Dolby ATMOS
Imago KK Times Square	8	1,018	Kota Kinabalu	

=== Sarawak ===
Cinema	Total Halls	Seats	Location	Remarks
Bintang Megamall	8	1,010	Miri	
CityOne Megamall	10	1,868	Kuching	Features D-BOX and Dolby ATMOS
The Spring Shopping Mall	9	1,508	Kuching	
The Spring Bintulu	9	1,118	Bintulu	Features D-BOX, Dolby ATMOS and GSC play

=== Selangor ===
Cinema	Total Halls	Seats	Location	Remarks
1 Utama (New Wing)	13	1,900	Petaling Jaya	Features 4DX, D-BOX, Dolby ATMOS, Play Park, Screen X, GSC BIG and Prestige Hall
IOI Mall Damansara	12	1,729	Petaling Jaya	Features GSC Big, Dolby ATMOS, ONYX LED Screen, GSC Play, MX4D and Premiere Class
IOI Mall Puchong	10	1,755	Puchong	Features GSC Play+
Paradigm Mall	9	1,592	Petaling Jaya	
Setia City Mall	9	1,570	Shah Alam	Features Dolby ATMOS
Subang Parade	9	1,249	Subang Jaya	Features GSC Play
Summit USJ	10	1,387	Subang Jaya	Features Dolby ATMOS and THX Hall
The Starling Mall	10	1,365	Petaling Jaya	Features GSC Play and MX4D

=== Terengganu ===
Cinema	Total Halls	Seats	Location	Remarks
Mayang Mall	8	TBA	Kuala Terengganu	First GSC cinema in Terengganu will be opening in 2026

== See also ==
- Lotus Five Star
- TGV Cinemas
- MBO Cinemas
