= Citta Mall =

Shopping mall in Petaling, Selangor, Malaysia

Coordinates: 3°06′44.0″N 101°34′44.4″E

CITTA Mall

- Location: Ara Damansara, Petaling Jaya, Selangor, Malaysia
- Address: 1, Jalan PJU 1a/48, Pusat Perdagangan Dana 1, 47301 Petaling Jaya, Selangor
- Opened: 25 June 2011
- Owner: ARA Harmony III
- Architect: Arkitek LLA
- Num. of stores: 89 units as of 1 May 2022
- Floor area: 522,550 square feet (48,546 m^{2}) as of 1 May 2022
- Floors: 3
- Website: https://www.citta.com.my

CITTA Mall is a shopping complex in Ara Damansara, Petaling Jaya, Selangor, Malaysia with anchor tenants such as GSC Cinemas, Village Grocer, Mr D.I.Y. and Harvey Norman. As of 1 May 2022, the mall's net lettable area (NLA) of 452,442 sq. ft. and it is reported to be 88.8% tenanted.

== History ==
CITTA Mall was established in 2011. Managed by CITTA Sdn Bhd, the shopping mall was owned by SEB Asset Management, a German real estate fund manager, and property developer Puncakdana Group and is now owned by ARA Harmony III and managed by ARA Asset Management Limited (ARA).

== An Open-Air Community Mall ==
CITTA, which means ‘mind’ and heart’ in Pali, adopts an open-air configuration and serves the surrounding Ara Damansara community by providing visitors with a variety of eateries and entertainment options. Its New Year's eve celebrations have become an anticipated annual event thanks to its fireworks display.

== Corporate information ==
CITTA Mall, 1 Mont Kiara, Klang Parade, Ipoh Parade, and AEON Bandaraya Melaka are managed by ARA Asset Management Limited (ARA). As of 30 June 2021, the total gross assets managed by ARA Group and its associates is more than US$95 billion in Asia Pacific.

== Access ==
CITTA Mall is accessible via the NKVE, Federal Highway, and Guthrie Corridor as well as the nearby Ara Damansara LRT station.

== See also ==
- Klang Parade
- Ipoh Parade
- 1 Mont Kiara
