= Yihai Kerry =

Food processing company based in China

Yihai Kerry Arawana Holdings Co., Ltd
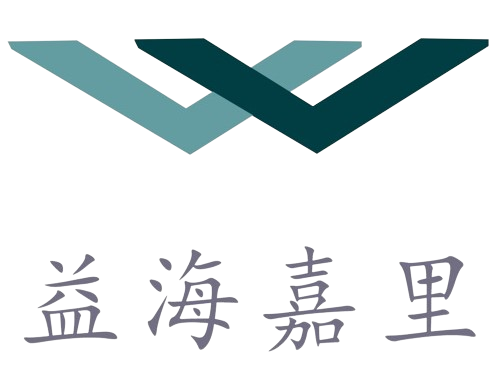

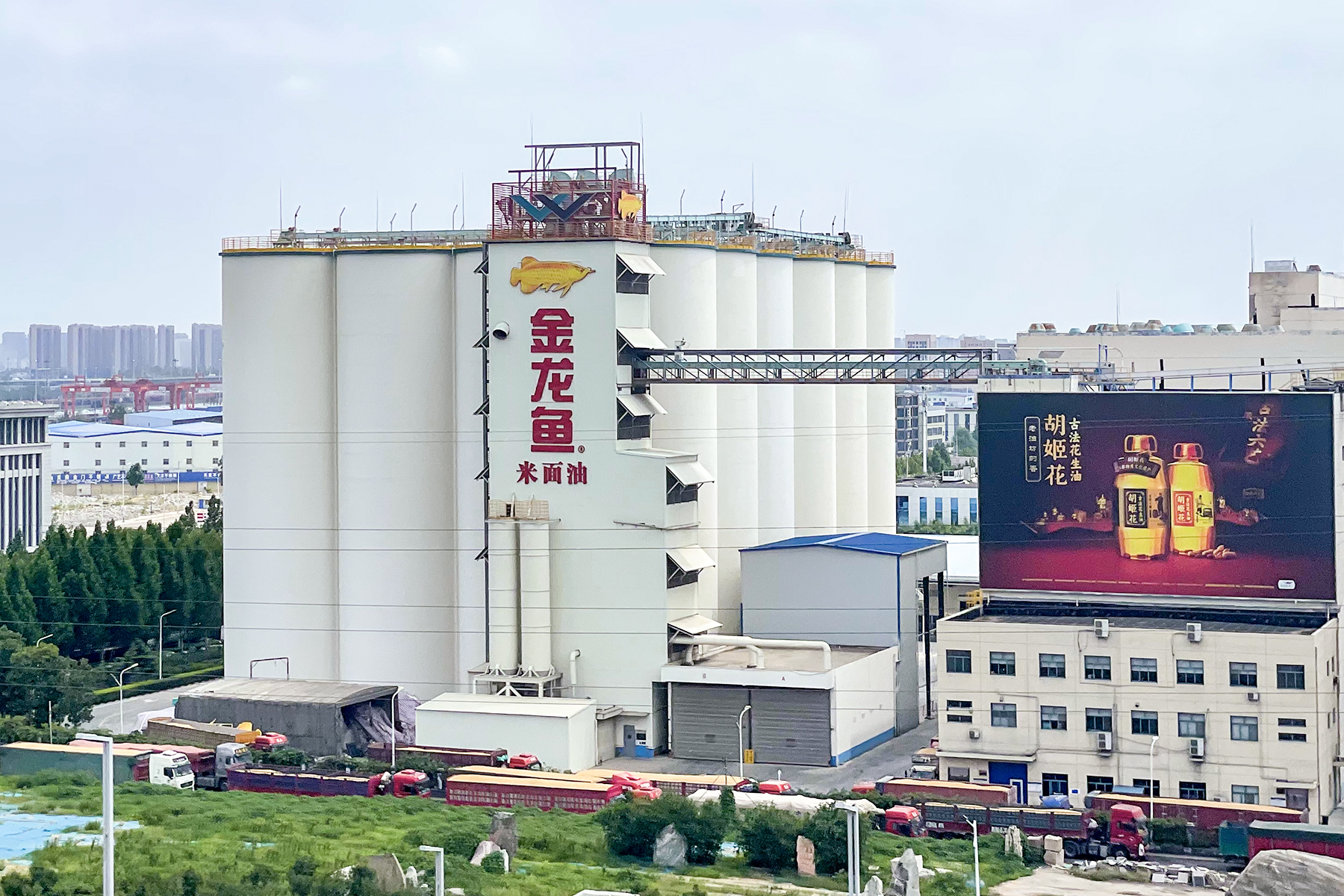
- Processing plant in Zhengzhou
- Native name: 益海嘉里金龙鱼粮油食品股份有限公司
- Formerly: Yihai Kerry Investments
- Type: Public subsidiary
- Traded as: SZSE: 300999
- Industry: Food processing
- Founded: 1988; 38 years ago
- Founders: Robert Kuok; Kuok Khoon Hong
- Headquarters: Shanghai, China
- Key people: Kuok Khoon Hong (Chairman); Mu Yankui (President)
- Revenue: ▼CN¥251.52 billion (2023)
- Net income: ▼CN¥2.79 billion (2023)
- Total assets: ▲CN¥238.50 billion (2023)
- Total equity: ▲CN¥95.97 billion (2023)
- Number of employees: 34,510 (2023)
- Parent: Wilmar International
- Website: www.yihaikerry.net

Yihai Kerry (also known as Yihai Kerry Arawana; Chinese: 益海嘉里; pinyin: Yìhǎi Jiālǐ) is a publicly listed food processing company that is the largest cooking oil processing company in China.

It is a subsidiary of Wilmar International.

== History ==
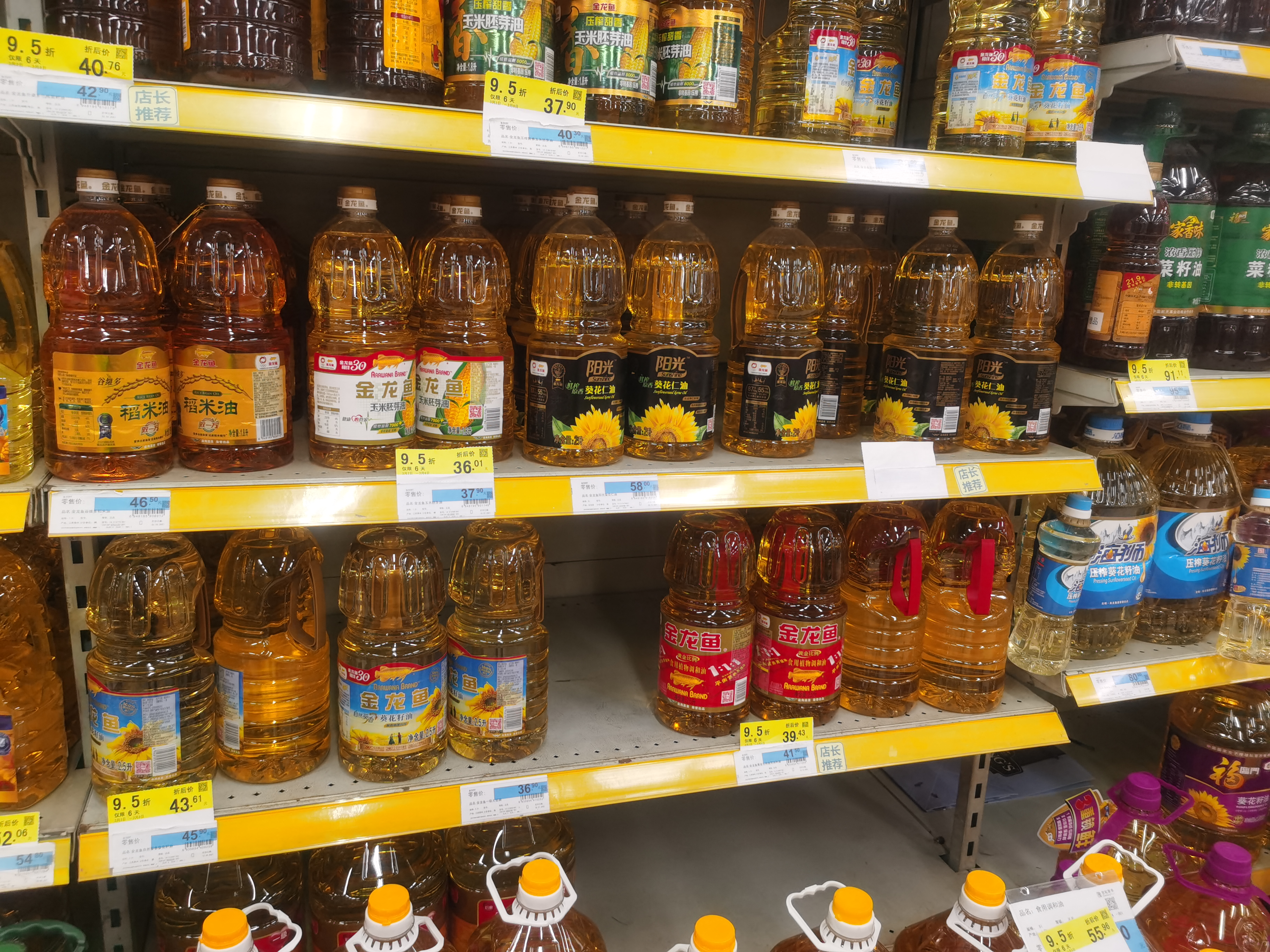
Arawana oil products in 2022

In 1987, Kuok Khoon Hong was sent to China by his uncle Robert Kuok to explore the market. He noticed that most people there used unbranded soybean oil that was easy to deteriorate and was harmful to health. Kuok believed that there was an opportunity to enter the China grain and oil market.

In 1988, Yihai Group was established under Kerry Oil and Grains and its first cooking oil processing plant was set up in China.

In 1991, Yihai Group launched Arawana, its first bottled cooking oil product brand to the Chinese market. The product proved popular and by 1999 sales reached 3,000 tonnes.

At the end of 2006, Wilmar International acquired Kerry Oil and Grains for $2.7 billion and merged it with Yihai Group to form Yihai Kerry. In that year some media claimed that Wilmar and COFCO Group had control over the cooking oil prices in China.

In 2007, Yihai Kerry expanded to rice products and in 2008 expanded to flour and grain products.

Originally part of Wilmar International, in January 2019 Yihai Kerry was restructured into an independent joint-stock company in preparation to go public.

In October 2020, Yihai Kerry held its initial public offering (IPO) becoming a listed company on the ChiNext board of the Shenzhen Stock Exchange. At its time it was the largest IPO on Shenzhen Stock Exchange raising 13.9 billion yuan ($2 billion) due to popular demand and was oversubscribed 3,499 times. The IPO came three years after China opened doors for foreign firms such as Bunge Global and Cargill to invest in the oilseeds crushing sector.

Since listing, Yihai Kerry has reported consecutive declines in profits due to higher material costs caused by the Russian invasion of Ukraine. In 2023, it reported a decline in profit for the second year.

In January 2024, Yihai Kerry stated one of its units had been sued in Anhui over its alleged role in loss-making palm oil trades between a state-owned trader Anhui Whywin International Co. and a privately owned counterparty Yunnan Huijia Import & Export Co. Ltd. The loss was 5.2 billion yuan ($725 million). Yihai Kerry denied allegations by a city prosecution agency that it was involved in the fraud and that all transactions conducted by its Guangzhou unit in the trades were in compliance with normal practices and contractual agreements.

In July 2024, there was a media report that alleged Yihai Kerry used tank trucks to transport cooking oil. Yihai Kerry stated it had strict supervision procedures in place for the transportation of cooking oil.

== See also ==
- Wilmar International
