= FGV =

FGV may refer to:

- FGV Holdings Berhad, a Malaysian plantation and food product company
- Ferrocarrils de la Generalitat Valenciana, a Spanish railway company
- Fichtelgebirge Club (German: Fichtelgebirgsverein), a German walking club
- Fundação Getulio Vargas, a Brazilian think tank
