= Klang Parade =

Shopping mall in Klang, Selangor, Malaysia

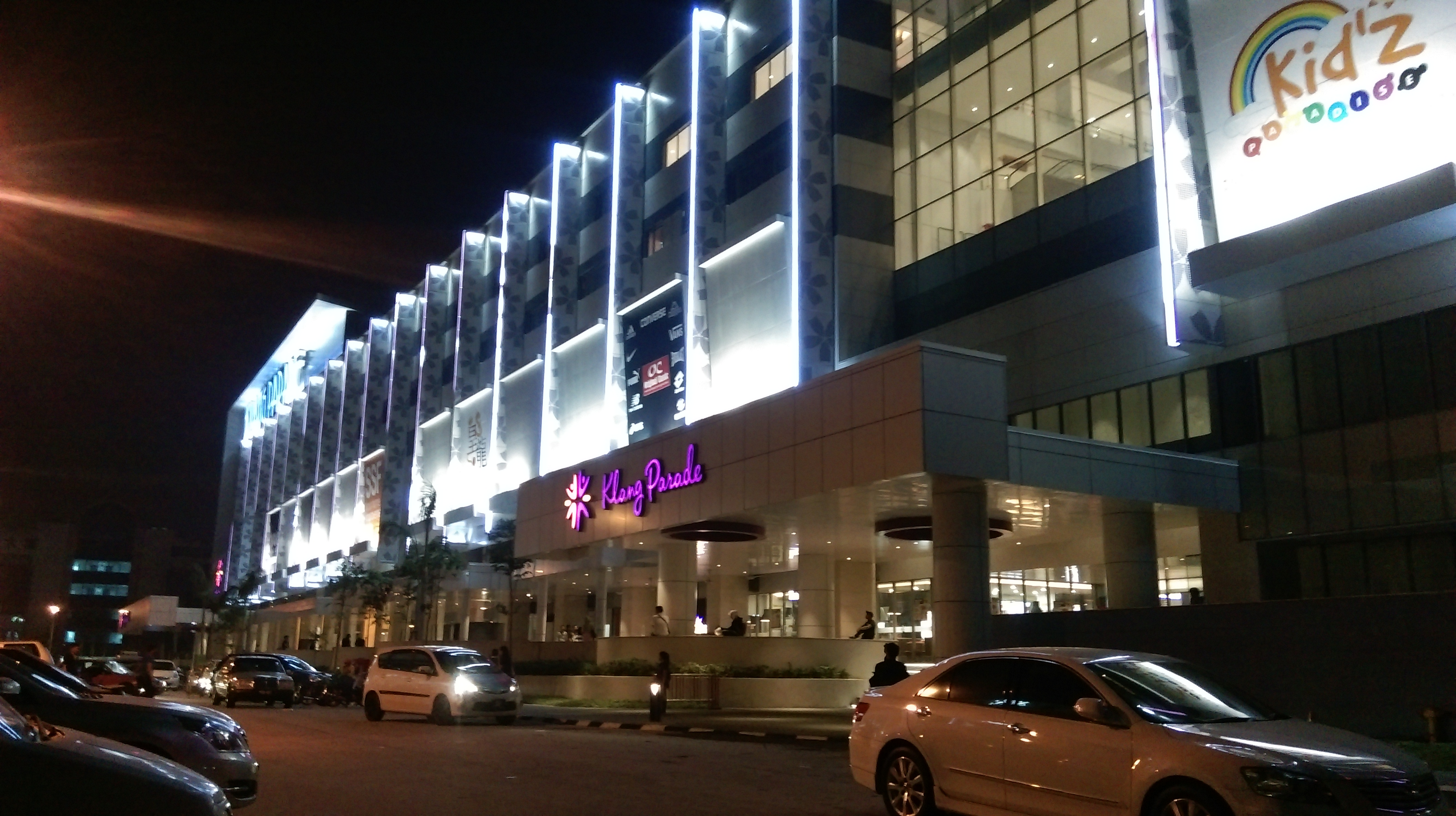
- Klang Parade at night.
- Location: Klang, Selangor, Malaysia
- Coordinates: 3°03′50″N 101°27′12″E
- Address: No 2112, KM2 Jalan Meru, 41050 Klang, Selangor
- Owner: ARA Harmony III
- Architect: Darryl Yamamoto
- Num. of stores: 231 units as of 1 March 2019
- Floor area: 1,600,000 square feet (148,645 m^{2}) as of 1 March 2019
- Floors: 5
- Website: https://www.klang.parade.com.my

Klang Parade is a shopping complex in Klang, Selangor, Malaysia with anchor tenants such as Econsave, Parkson and Cold Storage. As of March 2019, the mall's net lettable area (NLA) of 675,407 sq. ft. and it is reported to be 98.6% tenanted.

== History ==
Klang Parade was established in 1995. It was built and operated by the Lion Group. The mall was sold to ARA Asia Dragon Fund in 2012 and was closed between July 2013 and January 2014 for a major refurbishment. It is now owned by ARA Harmony III and managed by ARA Asset Management Limited (ARA).

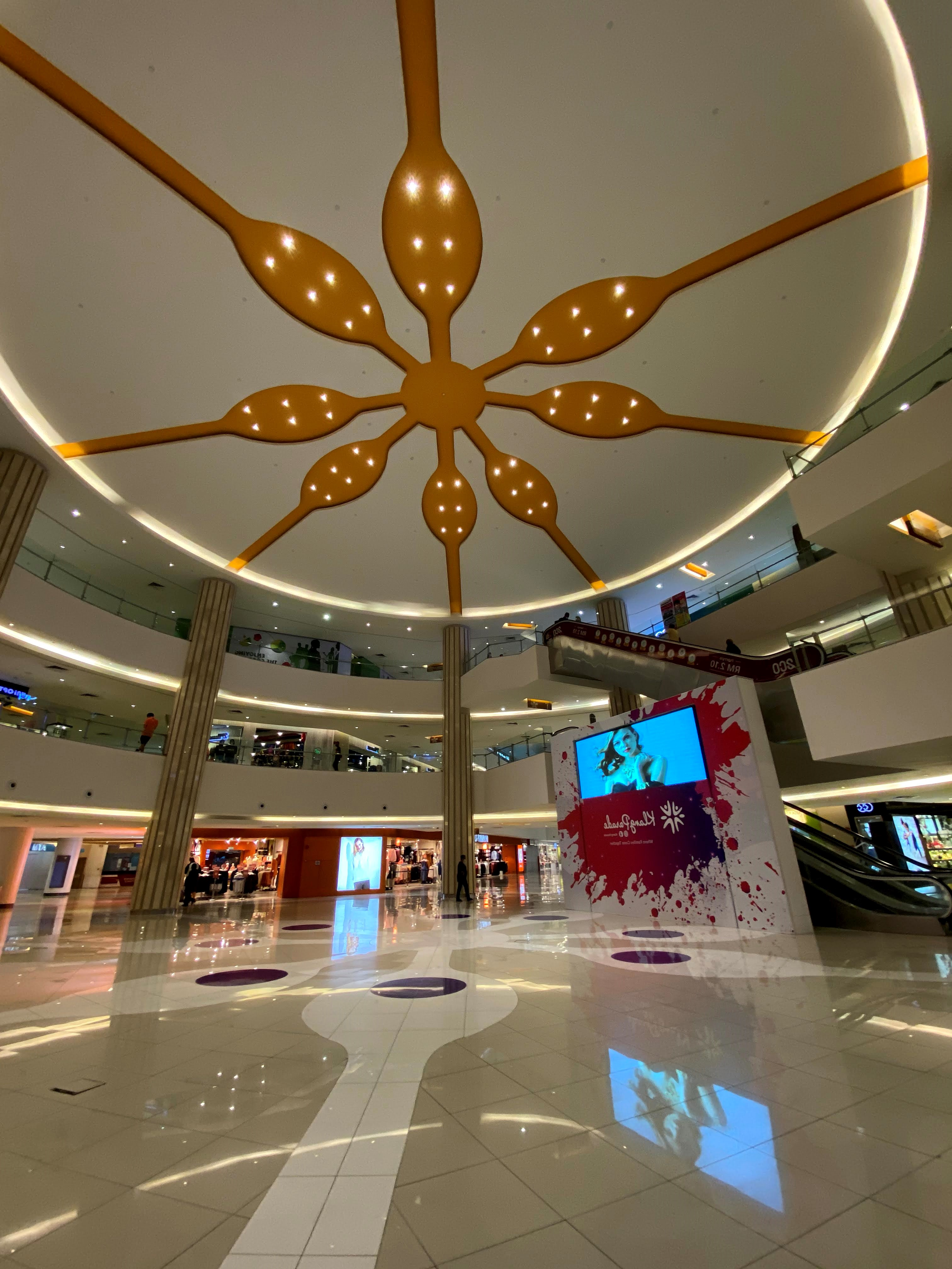
The main atrium of the mall.

The mall underwent major refurbishment in 2013 and was reopened in 2014 with a total built-up area of 1,704,610 sq ft. The newly refreshed family-centric venue doubles as a massive event space, which has played host to a variety of events such as the annual Shuddup N’ Dance competitions attended by local and regional street dancers.

== Awards won ==
- International Property Award (2016 – 2017)
- Klang's Best Managed Facilities for the Disabled Award 2018

== Corporate information ==
Klang Parade (along with four other malls in Malaysia: Citta Mall, 1 Mont Kiara, Ipoh Parade, and AEON Bandaraya Melaka) is managed by ARA Asset Management Limited (ARA). As of 30 June 2019, Gross Assets Managed by ARA Group and its Associates is more than S$83 billion across over 100 cities in 23 countries.

== Transport ==
=== Buses ===
Klang Parade is accessible via the following 96 Seranas and Smart Selangor bus services. Stations serving the mall are located at both sides of Jalan Meru and Jalan Pekan Baru.

=== Rail ===
The mall is connected to the LRT Shah Alam line via the Jalan Meru LRT station, which opened in 29 June 2026.
