= PPB Group =

Malaysian food production company

PPB Group Berhad
- Type: Public limited company
- Traded as: MYX: 4065; FTSE Bursa Malaysia KLCI component
- ISIN: MYL4065OO008
- Industry: Conglomerate: Food production; Agriculture; Waste management; Film distribution; Property investment; Property development
- Founded: 1968; 58 years ago as Perlis Plantations Berhad
- Founder: Robert Kuok
- Headquarters: UBN Tower; Jalan P. Ramlee, Kuala Lumpur, Malaysia
- Key people: Oh Siew Nam (chairman); Lim Soon Huat (managing director)
- Products: Flour; Animal feed; Consumer goods; Packaged food
- Services: Retail real estate; Residential property development; Waste management; Film distribution; Cinema operations
- Revenue: ▲RM4.0 billion (2015)
- Operating income: ▼RM0.2 billion (2015)
- Net income: ▲RM1.1 billion (2015)
- Total assets: ▲RM21.9 billion (2015)
- Total equity: ▲RM20.6 billion (2015)
- Owner: Robert Kuok
- Parent: Kuok Brothers Sdn Bhd (50.81%)
- Subsidiaries: FFM Berhad; Golden Screen Cinemas Sdn Bhd; Chemquest Sdn Bhd; PPB Hartabina Sdn Bhd
- Website: www.ppbgroup.com

PPB Group Berhad is a Malaysian diversified conglomerate which engages in food production, agriculture, waste management, film distribution, property investment and development. PPB is also the single largest shareholder of Wilmar International, one of the leading palm oil producers and agribusiness companies in the world.

The company was founded in 1968 as Perlis Plantations Berhad (from which it derives its current name) by Robert Kuok to cultivate and mill sugar cane in the northern Malaysian state of Perlis. The company went public in 1972 and has since ventured into other industries, although it exited the sugar business in 2009. Today, its main business is the supply of flour to downstream food producers. Its subsidiary, FFM, is the largest flour miller in Malaysia. The Kuok family retains control of the company with a 50.8 percent shareholding.

== History ==
=== Establishment ===
The businessman Robert Kuok and his brother Philip founded the company Kuok Brothers as a rice wholesaler in Malaya in 1948. They ventured into the sugar and flour milling business in the 1950s and 60s.

In 1952, Kuok Brothers began acquiring sugar plantations in 1952 and founded Perlis Plantations Berhad in 1968 to house its sugar cane cultivation and milling business. The company also established Malaysian Sugar Manufacturing Company (MSM), a sugar refiner, in 1959. Kuok said the choice to switch from the rice to sugar business was due to tough competition in the rice market in the 1950s. Having gone to school in the English-medium Raffles Institution in Singapore, he also had an advantage in the sugar industry since the sugar trade was conducted in English.

Kuok Brothers also established Federal Flour Mills (FFM) in 1962, entering the flour milling industry to take advantage of the government's import-substitution economic policy.

By the end of the 1960s, through PPB, MSM and its sugar commodities trading business, Kuok Brothers was said to control more than 10 percent of the world's sugar supplier, earning Kuok the nickname "the Sugar King."

=== Expansion and diversification ===
Kuok took PPB public in 1972. The listing coincided with Kuok shifting the focus of his business outside Malaysia, especially to Singapore. Subsequently, Kuok Brothers began consolidating its core businesses into PPB. PPB acquired MSM in 1976 and added FFM to its fold in 1987.

In the 1980s, the company expanded into the property development and palm oil plantation industries.

It acquired local property developer Tai Yan Realty (since renamed PPB Hartabina) and a 34 percent stake in Shaw Brothers Malaysia between 1982 and 1984. Its involvement in properties also led to the company venturing in retail by operating several supermarkets and discount stores throughout Malaysia. From 1996 to 2000, it operated the Tops chain of supermarkets in a joint venture with Dutch retailer Ahold, but exited the business due to continuing losses. The property division also included Rasa Sayang Beach Hotels from 1987 until 1999 when it was transferred to the Shangri-La Group.

PPB entered into a joint venture with Golden Harvest (International) Ltd of Hong Kong to establish Golden Screen Cinemas (GSC) to take over the Shaw cinema chain in 1987. The group subsequently bought out Golden Harvest's stake. GSC has since grown into one of Malaysia's largest cinema chains and film distributors.

In 1986 and 1987 respectively, PPB acquired Saremas Sdn Bhd (in Sarawak) and 60 percent of Sapi Plantations (in Sabah) to establish itself in the palm oil plantation business. It also acquired a 70 percent interest in Indonesian palm oil producer PT Tidar Sungkai Sawit (PTSS) in 1995. The East Malaysian palm oil businesses were consolidated into PPB Oil Palms Berhad in 1997 and was listed in the Kuala Lumpur Stock Exchange. PTSS was transferred into PPB Oil Palms in 2000. In the 1990s, the group acquired a majority holding in Chemquest Sdn Bhd in stages to enter the waste management business. In 2001, Chemquest, through its 25 percent stake in Konsortium Abbas Sdn Bhd, won a 30-year concession to operate the Sungai Semenyih Dam and Water Treatment Plant.

In retail business, PPB operated Kerry's, named after one of Kuok's group companies in Hong Kong. Kerry's began as a joint venture with Japanese supermarket chain Chujitsuya through Chujitsu Superstores Sdn Bhd with only two stores opened in Kuala Lumpur (Cheras and Ampang City). In 1991, PPB increased its equity of the joint venture to 65% and renamed it as Kerry's to reflect the increased local management and shareholding. With the store in Johor Bahru becoming the flagship store, Kerry's plans to open a new store every "12 to 18 months" depending on the "right conditions", eventually totalling to 7 or 8 stores.

=== 2000s ===
In 2007, the group divested its stake in PPB Oil Palms to Wilmar International in exchange for Wilmar shares. As a result, it now has an 18.3 percent interest in Wilmar, making it the single largest shareholder.

PPB also sold MSM and other sugar-related businesses to Felda Global Ventures in 2009 for RM1.25 billion.

== Business ==
=== Flour and feed milling ===
Flour and feed milling is the group's largest segment by sales. The segment comprises FFM Berhad, an 80 percent subsidiary of the group. FFM is the largest flour miller in Malaysia with a total milling capacity of 2,550 megatonnes per day. FFM also operates mills in Vietnam, Thailand and China through associate companies. FFM is also a significant player in the animal feed business in Malaysia.

=== Film exhibition and distribution ===
Golden Screen Cinemas (GSC), a subsidiary of the group, is the largest cinema chain in Malaysia. GSC operates in 37 locations throughout Malaysia, mainly in shopping centres under the cineplex and boutique/luxury concepts.

GSC also distributes Chinese, independent English and foreign language films to cinemas, television channels and hotel operators.

=== Environmental engineering ===
The group, through is subsidiary Chemquest, provides water treatment, waste management and chemicals manufacturing solutions in Malaysia.

=== Properties ===
The group's property investment division owns and manages Cheras Leisure Mall and Cheras Plaza in Cheras, and New World Park in Penang.

Its property development subsidiary, PPB Hartabina, develops mainly residential properties. The group is part of a joint venture with Khazanah Nasional developing the Puteri Harbour mixed residential, office and retail development in the Iskandar Malaysia development corridor in southern Johor.

=== Palm oil ===
PPB is an 18 percent shareholder in associate company Wilmar International, an agribusiness group based in Singapore. Wilmar is one of the largest cultivators of palm oil and the largest palm oil trader in the world. Due to Wilmar's size, it contributes to more than half of PPB's pre-tax profits (under the equity method of recognising its share of Wilmar's profits in its own profit or loss).
