= Martua Sitorus =

Indonesian businessman and palm oil magnate

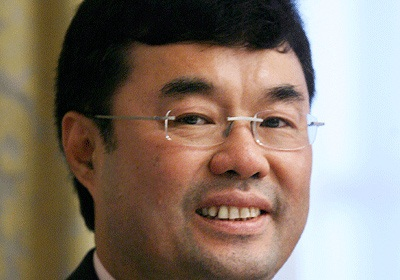
- Born: 18 February 1960 (age 65); Pematang Siantar, North Sumatra
- Occupations: Co-Founder, Non Executive Director (since April 2017) of Wilmar International
- Known for: Indonesia's 12th wealthiest people (Dec 2020), 1196th world (Dec 2020)
- Spouse: Rosa Taniasuri Ong
- Children: 5

Martua Sitorus (born as Thio Seng Hap, 1960) is an Indonesian businessman and palm oil magnate. He was once known as the fourth richest person in Indonesia (and #377 in the world), but had decreased to fifteenth by December 2018, according to Forbes. He and his business partner, Kuok Khoon Hong founded the Singapore-based Wilmar International, the largest palm oil producer in the world.

Wilmar's business activities include oil palm cultivation, oilseeds crushing, edible oils refining, sugar milling and refining, specialty fats, oleochemicals, biodiesel and fertilizers manufacturing and grains processing. It has over 300 manufacturing plants and an extensive distribution network covering China, India, Indonesia, United States and some 50 other countries.

== Personal life ==
Martua was born in Pematang Siantar, a town located in North Sumatra, Indonesia. After finishing high school, he continued to the University of HKBP Nomensen, Medan which was the largest city in North Sumatra, to finish his economic degrees. During his teenage years, Martua traded fish; when grown up he started his business as a palm oil and mesocarp trader.

== Career ==
=== Wilmar International ===
Martua along with Kuok Khoon Hong, the nephew of Malaysia's richest tycoon Robert Kuok, founded Wilmar International Limited and by 1991 he owned 7.100 hectare of palm tree plantations, and also built his own palm oil refinery in North Sumatra. The Wilmar International business has grown rapidly; by 2013 Wilmar owns more than 50 other companies with 300 manufacturing plants around the world. Martua also owns London skyscraper Aviva Tower and a hospital in Medan, Murni Teguh Memorial Hospital, which is named after Martua's mother, Murni Teguh. The hospital was launched on 12 December 2012 (12/12/2012).

In 2014, Sitorus also formed a partnership with Roys Poyiadjis to create the largest biofuel power plant in Japan. The plant's 20 year feed-in tariff is valued at $1.5 billion US dollars.

=== Gama Corporation ===
Apart from Wilmar, Martua and his elder brother Ganda Thio co-founded Gama Corporation in 2011, which runs property, cement plant and other businesses through subsidiaries Gama Land and Semen Merah Putih. Gama itself refer to the names of its founders, Ganda & Martua (Ga-ma). Gama Corp owns the 64-story Gama Tower which is located at Rasuna Said - Jakarta, Indonesia. Gama Tower is known as the tallest building in Indonesia. The Westin Hotel, Jakarta branch, is located on the top floors of this building above the Gama Corporation offices.

== See also ==
- Energy in Indonesia
