= Kuok Khoon Hong =

Singaporean billionaire and businessman

- Born: 1949 (age 76–77); Mersing, Johor, Malaysia
- Education: Bachelor of Business Administration, National University of Singapore (https://www.wilmar-international.com/about-us/leadership)
- Occupation: Businessman
- Title: Chairman and CEO of Wilmar International; Chairman of Yihai Kerry; Non-Executive Chairman of Adani Wilmar
- Spouse: Married
- Children: 4
- Parent(s): Kuok Hock Swee (Father), Tan Sek Meng (mother)
- Relatives: Robert Kuok (Uncle)

Kuok Khoon Hong (simplified Chinese: 郭孔丰; traditional Chinese: 郭孔豐; pinyin: Guō Kǒng Fēng; Pe̍h-ōe-jī: Koeh Khóng-hong; born c. 1949) is a Singaporean business magnate, entrepreneur and philanthropist, often referred to as the “Palm Oil King” He is the co-founder, chairman and CEO of Wilmar International (simplified Chinese: 丰益国际; traditional Chinese: 豐益國際; Pe̍h-ōe-jī: Hong-ek Kok-chè), having built it into one of Asia's leading agribusiness groups, and the world's largest palm oil trader. He is also the co-founder and chairman of Yihai Kerry, and the non-executive chairman of Adani Wilmar Ltd. He has an estimated net worth of US$3.7 billion as of January 2021.

== Career ==
Kuok earned a Bachelor of Business Administration degree from the National University of Singapore in 1973 and began his career trading soft commodities at Kuok Oils and Grains. He eventually became managing director of Kuok Oils and Grains, and developed the Pasir Gudang Edible Oils refining complex in Johor, followed by China's first edible oil refinery, South Seas Oils and Fats.

In 1991, he left the Kuok Group to start Wilmar, with Chinese Indonesian businessman Martua Sitorus soon after coming on board as a co-founder. Starting as a small commodities trading company with S$2m in seed capital from the mortgage of his family home, and further seed funding obtained from Kuok Hock Swee and Sons, his father's investment company. Wilmar grew rapidly from the outset, with initial growth in the Indonesian edible oil market, followed up with development of Sumatran oil palm plantations and Indonesian edible oil refineries. A large expansion into edible oil refining in mainland China, and a joint venture with the Adani Group in India subsequently placed it in leading positions within Asia's largest consumer edible oil markets.

In 2007, after a 16-year estrangement, he agreed with his uncle Robert Kuok to merge the Kuok Group's edible oil, trading and oil palm plantation assets into Wilmar in return for a 31% stake in the company. The merger resulted in the unification of Kuok's previous early career contributions to the Kuok Group with the rapid growth of Wilmar International led by him and Martua Sitorus since 1991.

In 2019, Kuok received the Chinese Government Friendship Award, the People's Republic of China's highest award for foreigners who have made outstanding contributions to the country's economic and social progress.

Kuok is the largest shareholder in Perennial Holdings, a Singapore-based integrated real estate and healthcare company.

In December 2024, Aroland Holdings, a UK real estate owner and developer in which Kuok Khoon Hong is a key shareholder, received approval to redevelop 1 Undershaft in the City of London by Eric Parry Architects to a height matching that of The Shard.

== Philanthropy ==
In May 2020, Kuok and his company, Wilmar International, donated SG$7 million to The Straits Times School Pocket Money Fund, as part of Singapore's COVID-19 community relief efforts.

Together with the Wilmar Group, he has set up and funded several schools in Indonesia as well as elderly homes and orphanages in China, the latter having won government recognition for its high quality model of charity operations and governance.

Kuok established the KKH Scholarship at the Singapore Management University and the Singapore University of Technology and Design, at Malaysian Public Universities with the Kuok Foundation , as well as the KKH Bursary at Magdalene College, Cambridge University.

In 2012, he was elected an Honorary Pepys Benefactor Fellow of Magdalene College, Cambridge University.

== Personal life ==
Kuok was born in the seaside village of Mersing in Johor, Malaysia, where he was educated at Sri Mersing Primary, and then St Joseph's School and the English College, Johor Bahru. He was the second of four children of Kuok Hock Swee and Tan Sek Meng. His father was an elder cousin of Malaysian Chinese billionaire Robert Kuok.

His father, Kuok Hock Swee, had arrived in then British Malaya from Fuzhou in Southern China at the age of 18. Enterprising and industrious, he eventually set up a provision store in Mersing on his own, which he expanded into a thriving business along the east coast of Peninsula Malaysia distributing provisions and foodstuffs. This was subsequently merged for an equity stake in Robert Kuok's rapidly expanding Kuok Group, which by then already included the first Shangri-La Hotel in Singapore (as described in Robert Kuok’s “A Memoir”).

Kuok is married with four children - 3 sons and 1 daughter. His eldest son, Dr Meng Han Kuok, is a British-Singaporean biotech entrepreneur and Cambridge-trained scientist, known for his work in global health innovation and biotechnology. His second son, Kuok Meng Ru, is the CEO of Caldecott Music Group and Co-Founder of the popular social music creation platform BandLab Technologies. He was previously the owner of Rolling Stone magazine.
