= Aman Central Mall =

Shopping mall in Alor Setar, Kedah, Malaysia

Aman Central

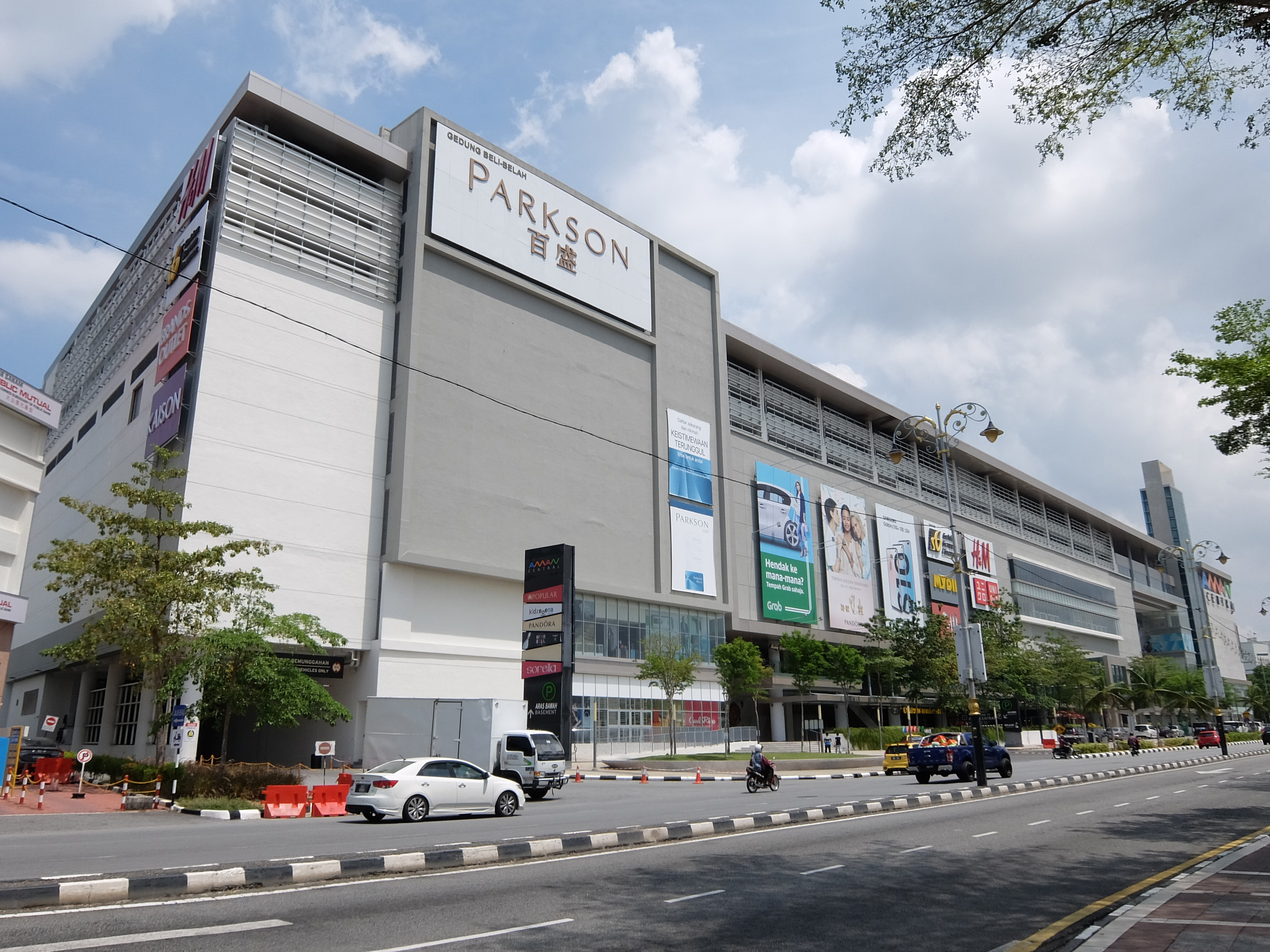
- Location: Alor Setar, Kedah
- Coordinates: 6.125737°N 100.366469°E
- Address: No.1 Aman Central, Lebuhraya Darulaman, 05100 Alor Setar
- Opened: 1 October 2015; 11 years ago (Soft opening); 28 March 2016; 10 years ago (Official opening)
- Developer: Belleview Group
- Owner: Great Realty Sdn Bhd
- Architect: GDP Architect
- Num. of stores: 400+
- Num. of anchor tenants: 3
- Floor area: 800,900 sq. ft.
- Floors: 8 floors with 2 basements
- Parking: 2000
- Public transit: Bus, Taxi
- Website: amancentral.com.my

Aman Central Mall is a shopping mall in Alor Setar, Kedah, Malaysia. It is located at the intersection of Jalan Tambang Badak, Jalan Mahdali and Jalan Teluk Wanjah, along Lebuhraya Darulaman opposite Alor Setar Tower. The location of Aman Central Mall was previously an abandoned site for more than 30 years which was initially proposed for Plaza Tunku Yaakob. In year 2011, the then state government led by MB Dato' Seri Azizan Abdul Razak invited Belleview Sdn Bhd to revive the site.

== About ==
Situated on 7.03 acres (3 hectares) of real estate, the shopping mall is the largest such place in the state of Kedah. It has a total built-up area of 2,000,000 square feet (185,806 m^{2}) and a net area of 800,000 square feet (74,322 m^{2}) spread over 6 levels with approximately 330 retail lots with more than 1,700 parking bays. The mall has shops, a 10-screen cinema owned by Golden Screen Cinemas, 30-lane bowling alley Aman Bowl, Lotus's supermarket, eateries and services.

== See also ==
- List of shopping malls in Malaysia

== Aman Central floor plan ==
Levels	South Zone	Central Zone	North Zone
L7	Multi-Storey Parking		
L6	Multi-Storey Parking, Utility Offices		
L5	Multi-Storey Parking, Management Office, Surau		
L4	Kids Zone, Bowling, Fashion Outlets, Entertainment Hub, Parkson, Kidzooona	Food Court, F&B Outlets, Popular Bookstore	F&B Outlets, Golden Screen Cinema, Arcade
L3	Fashion Outlets, Entertainment Hub, Parkson	Fashion Outlets, F&B Outlets	Fashion Outlets, F&B Outlets
L2	Fashion Outlets, Entertainment Hub, Parkson	Fashion Outlets, F&B Outlets	Fashion Outlets, F&B Outlets
L1	Fashion Outlets, Entertainment Hub, Parkson	Fashion Outlets, F&B Outlets, Outdoor Dining Area	Fashion Outlets, F&B Outlets, Outdoor Dining Area
GF	South Entrance, Fashion Outlets, Entertainment Hub, Parkson	Main Entrance, Fashion Outlets, F&B Outlets, Outdoor Dining Area	North Entrance, Fashion Outlets, H&M, Padini, Vincci, Loading bay
LGM	To LG, Parking	Marketplace Parking	Marketplace Parking
LG	Marketplace, Lotus, F&B Outlets, Security Office, Loading bay	Marketplace Parking	Marketplace Parking
