= Unity Foods =

Pakistani food and edible oil company

- Type: Public
- Traded as: PSX: UNITY
- ISIN: PK0068801015
- Industry: Fast-moving consumer goods Edible oil
- Founded: 1991; 35 years ago in Karachi, Pakistan (as Taha Spinning Mills)
- Headquarters: Karachi, Pakistan
- Area served: Worldwide
- Key people: Amir Shehzad (CEO)
- Products: Sunridge; Dastak; Ehtimam; Zauqeen; Lagan; Unity Oil; Pure
- Revenue: ▲ Rs. 100.870 billion (US$360 million) (2023)
- Operating income: ▼ Rs. 3.878 billion (US$14 million) (2023)
- Net income: ▼ Rs. 675.091 million (US$2.4 million) (2023)
- Total assets: ▲ Rs. 77.549 billion (US$280 million) (2023)
- Total equity: ▲ Rs. 21.307 billion (US$76 million) (2023)
- Owner: Wilmar International (49%, through subsidiaries)
- Number of employees: 577 (2023)
- Website: unityfoods.pk
- Footnotes; Financials as of 30 June 2023

Unity Foods Limited, formerly known as Taha Spinning Mills, is a Pakistani fast-moving consumer goods (FMCG) company headquartered in Karachi. It is partially owned by Singaporean multinational agribusiness Wilmar International through its subsidiaries Wilmar Pakistan Holdings and Unity Wilmar Agro.

== History ==
=== 1991–2016: Early history ===
Unity Foods was incorporated in Pakistan in 1991 as Taha Spinning Mills Limited, a yarn manufacturing company, and was converted into a public limited company on 16 June 1991. The company suspended its yarn manufacturing operations in 2008 due to mounting losses and a liquidity crisis, and its mills closed down completely by 2012 following litigation with creditors. In 2013, the company's land and building were sold for Rs124 million.

=== 2016–present: Unity Foods ===
In 2016, a new ownership and management team led by Muhammad Farrukh Amin acquired the listed shell through a reverse merger, and changed the business focus to edible oil. In June 2017, the board approved a rights issue to raise Rs. 1.65 billion to fund the acquisition of a solvent extraction plant, an oil refinery, and other ancillary assets. The company's principal business activity was formally changed from yarn manufacturing to edible oil extraction and refining.

In 2019, Unity Foods raised an additional Rs. 3.75 billion through a follow-on equity offering and acquired a crude palm oil refinery at Port Qasim for approximately Rs850 million. The transaction raised the company's refining capacity from 150 to 650 metric tons per day. In the same year, Unity Foods acquired a 69 percent stake in flour company Sunridge Foods for Rs. 367 million, subsequently raising its holding to 100 percent.

In July 2020, Singaporean agribusiness Wilmar International, with its subsidiary Unity Wilmar Agro acquired 103.3 million shares for US$8.49 million. Later that year, the company announced a Sukuk issue of up to Rs. 3 billion to finance working capital. In 2020, Sunridge Foods acquired the assets of Uni-Food Industries Limited, a joint venture of Faran Sugar, Habib Sugar, and Mehran Sugar operating in the bakery and confectionery segment, as well as a rice and flour mill at Jaranwala Road, Sheikhupura.

In March 2024, Wilmar Pakistan Holdings, Unity Wilmar Agro acquired an additional 277.07 million shares of Unity Foods at Rs. 24.89 per share for a total of Rs. 6.89 billion. The Competition Commission of Pakistan subsequently authorised the transaction.

In December 2025, founder and long-serving chief executive Muhammad Farrukh Amin resigned as CEO and transitioned to the role of non-executive director, with board chairman Amir Shehzad assuming the role of CEO effective 23 December 2025. Pursuant to a Shareholders' Agreement dated 21 December 2025 between Amin and Wilmar International, management control of Unity Foods was assumed by Wilmar. The newly appointed CEO resigned on 13 February 2026, and two independent directors also stepped down, leaving the board without the quorum required to function.

In 2026, Wilmar International disclosed a US$150 million loss provision tied to its investment in Unity Foods, stating that it had become aware during 2025 that Unity was experiencing difficulties servicing certain bank facilities despite previously published financial statements indicating profitability and material liquid assets. Wilmar sought guidance from Pakistani regulators on whether an administrator should be appointed, whether an independent investigation should be launched, and whether trading in Unity shares should be suspended pending such a probe. Shareholder proceedings between Wilmar International and Amin were filed before the courts in Pakistan.

== Operations ==
Unity Foods is engaged in the extraction and refining of edible oil in Pakistan and in the processing, manufacturing, and distribution of food products. The company sells fortified flour, basmati rice, lentils, pulses, and other kitchen staples under the Sunridge brand, and edible oils and banaspati under the Dastak, Ehtimam, Zauqeen, Lagan, and Unity Oil brands. It also produces animal feed ingredients for dairy cattle, goats, and sheep under the Pure brand, as well as specialty fats for the chocolate, confectionery, and bakery segments. The company sources soybean and canola seeds from the United States and palm oil and specialty fats from Malaysia and Indonesia.

Unity Foods operates two edible oil refineries at SITE and Port Qasim, with soybean and canola crushing plants in Kotri. Sunridge Foods, its wholly owned subsidiary, operates a PESA mill at Port Qasim. The company exports products to Sri Lanka, Malaysia, Vietnam, Bangladesh, the United Arab Emirates, China, and Singapore.
