= Asiatic Persada =

Palm oil firm from Jambi, Indonesia

PT Asiatic Persada is a palm oil firm from Jambi, Indonesia. It was founded in 1979.

The company's oil palm plantations cover an area of approximately 270 square kilometres (100 sq mi). Wilmar International has divested from PT Asiatic Persada due to allegations of the company's involvement in land grabs. The Suku Anak Dalam community has been in a land rights dispute with the company for over 30 years.

The forest of Bungku village was cleared for giant palm oil plantations of PT Asiatic Persada in the mid-1980s. In the following years, the company’s bulldozers illegally claimed a further 200 square kilometres (77 sq mi) of rain forest — an area about half the size of Berlin, including areas for which indigenous peoples held guaranteed land rights.

Ganda Group, owned by Ganda Sitorus, the younger brother of Martua Sitorus, the co-founder of Wilmar International, bought PT Asiatic Persada in 2013. In the same year, the governor of Jambi urged officials to review PT Asiatic Persada’s license because of violations of the law. Copies of the letter were also sent to the Justice Ministry and the national police chief.

In 2014, PT Asiatic Persada security killed a man and injured 5 others, all from the Suku Anak Dalam community.
