= FGV Holdings =

Malaysian global agribusiness and food company

FGV Holdings Berhad
- Type: Publicly traded government-owned investment company
- Traded as: MYX: 5222
- ISIN: MYL5222OO004
- Industry: Agribusiness and Food
- Founded: 19 December 2007; 18 years ago
- Headquarters: Kuala Lumpur, Malaysia
- Key people: Fakhrunniam Othman; (GCEO)
- Website: www.fgvholdings.com/home

FGV Holdings Berhad (Note: The company also known as Felda Global on their official website.) (Abbreviation: FGV, sometimes FGVH; or formerly Felda Global Ventures Holdings Berhad; MYX: 5222) is a Malaysian-based global agribusiness and food company. It is an affiliate of the Federal Land Development Authority (FELDA).

With operations worldwide, FGV produces oil palm and rubber products, oleochemicals and sugar products, with materials sourced from FELDA colonies throughout the country.

== Background ==
Its initial public offering in 2012 was the third largest in the world that year after Facebook and biggest IPO in Asia which raised US$3.1 billion.

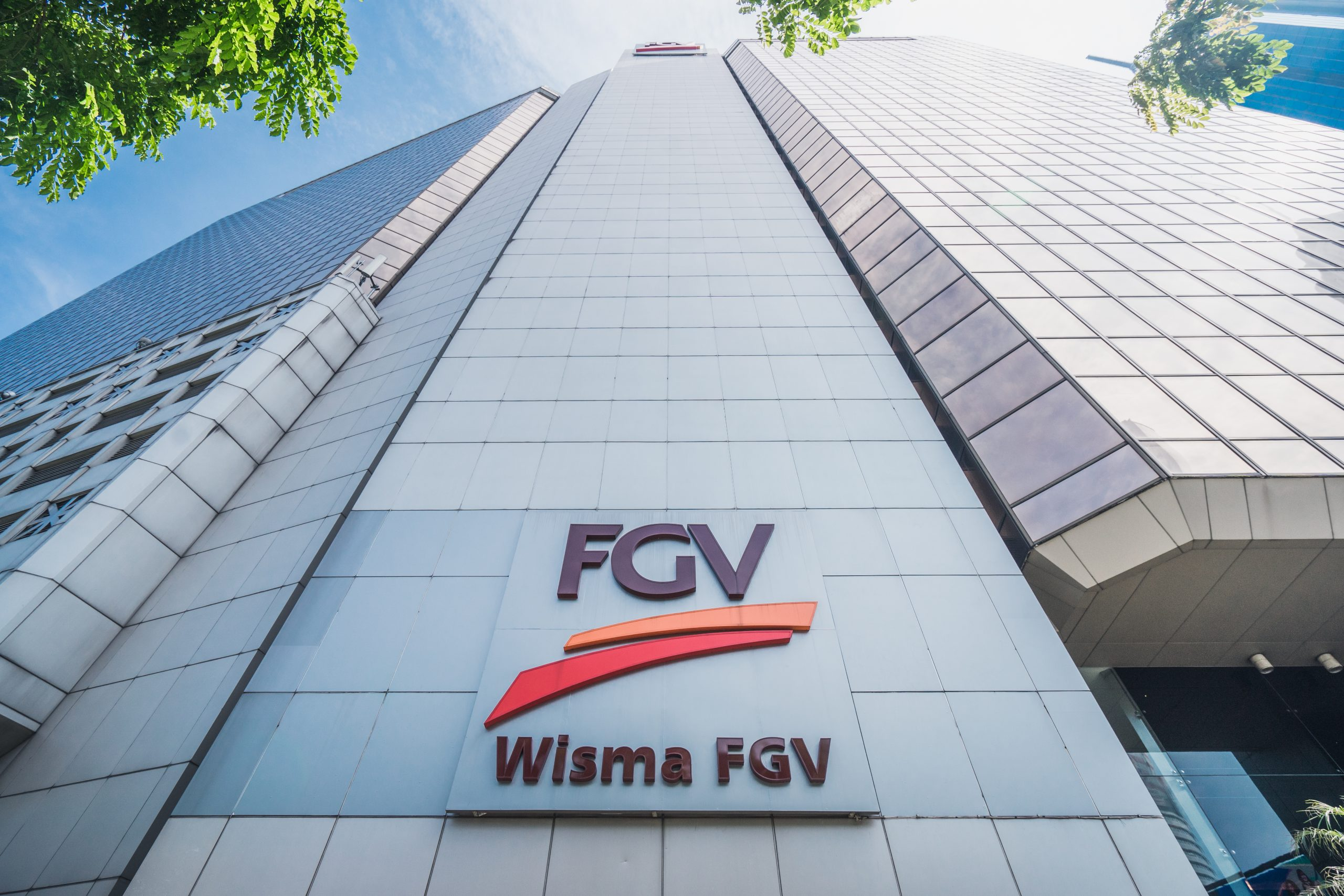
Wisma FGV in Kuala Lumpur.

It is the third largest palm oil company in the world by planted acreage. FGV manages a total land bank of 439,230 hectares in Malaysia and Indonesia including land under Land Lease Agreement (LLA) with Felda. The company produces approximately 3 million metric tonnes of crude palm oil annually.

In 2009, FGV purchased 51% of the largest sugar refiner in Malaysia, MSM Malaysia Holdings from PPB Group Berhad (founded by Robert Kuok) for RM1.25 billion.

On 3 July 2018, the company dropped the phrase "Felda Global Ventures" from their corporate name and renamed as FGV Holdings Berhad.

On 30 October 2024, the company made a public announcement on the appointment of Fakhrunniam Othman as the new Group Chief Executive Officer.

== US sanctions ==
On 1 October 2020, the company's products were banned by U.S. Customs and Border Protection, citing forced labour and human rights abuses, including "physical and sexual abuse, debt bondage and abusive conditions."
