= FST Cinemas =

Malaysian cinema chain

FST Cinemas (M) Sdn Bhd
- Type: Private Limited Company
- Industry: Media, Entertainment
- Founded: 2004
- Headquarters: Malaysia
- Products: Cinemas, Film distribution
- Website: www.fst.com.my

FST Cinemas (M) Sdn Bhd (d/b/a FST Cinemas; formerly Big Cinema and LFS Cinemas) is a cinema chain in Malaysia owned by the Lotus Group. Today, it operates over 16 cinemas and is the third largest cinema chain in Malaysia after Golden Screen Cinemas and TGV Cinemas.

FST is also a major Indian movie distributor in Malaysia.

== Overview ==
Lotus Five Star is a cinema chain that began in the 1996 and now operates 24 cinemas. LFS screens multilingual movies of different genres to satisfy the interests of its wide range of customers. They also own Coliseum Theatre, the oldest cinema in Malaysia, since 2012 which is more popularly known as the "Indian Cinema" or also "Tamil Cinema" among the locals due to most of their premieres being Kollywood, Tollywood and Bollywood movies.

In 2013, Big Cinemas has been completely merged with MBO Cinemas. Since 1 October 2017, the ownership of 13 Lotus Five Star locations were transferred and rebranded as mmCineplexes.

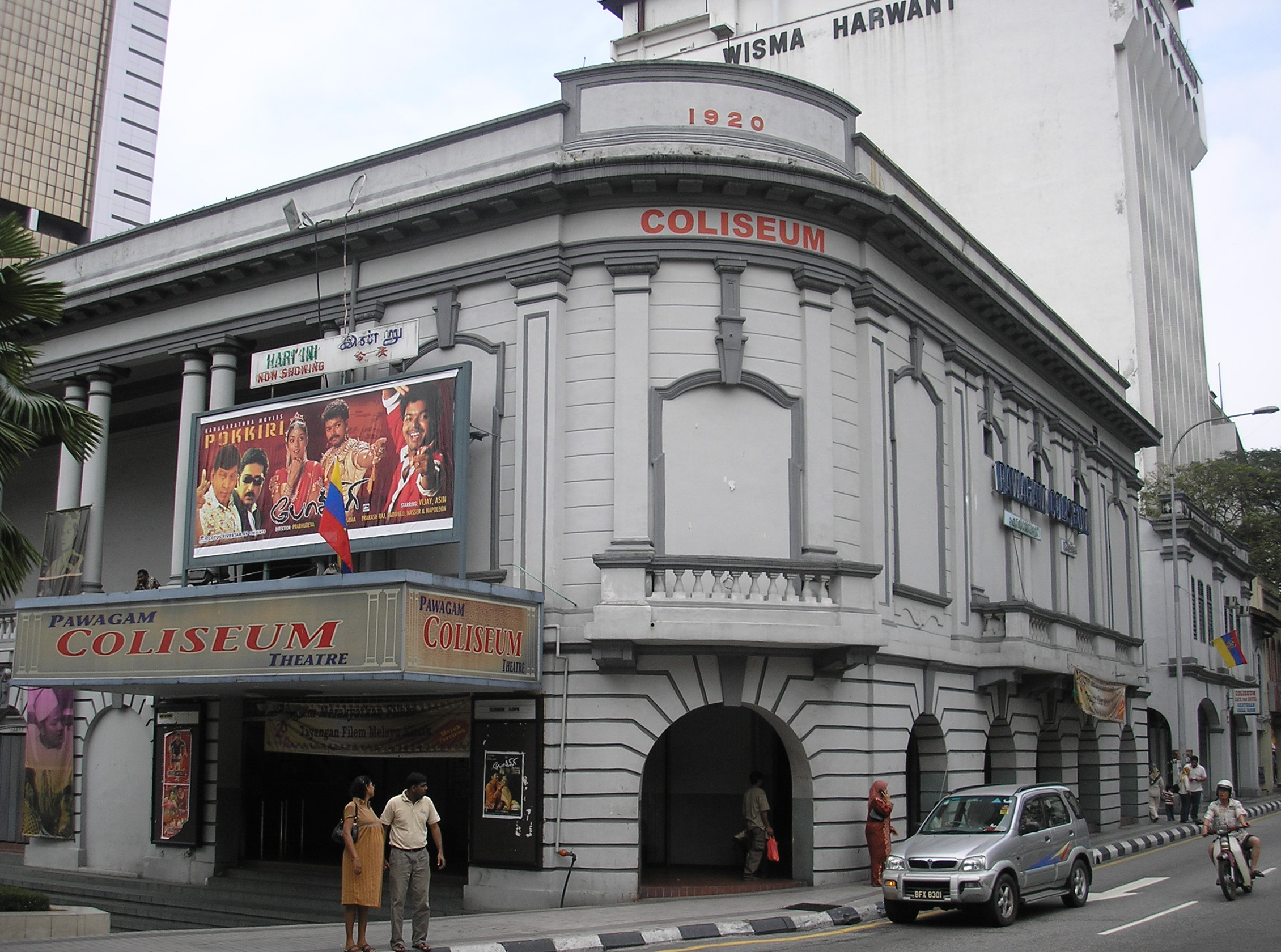
FST Cinemas currently operates the oldest cinema in Malaysia, Coliseum Theatre

In April 21 2026, LFS Cinemas rebranded as FST Cinemas with the tagline Feel Stories Together. The rebrand to FST Cinemas is a part of a unified identity rebrand among the Lotus Group of companies.

== Locations ==
=== North ===
- FST Butterworth
- FST Kompleks Bukit Jambul, Bayan Lepas
- FST Prangin Mall, George Town
- FST Seri Kinta, Bangunan Seri Kinta, Ipoh
- FST Kampar, Kampar
- FST Wisma Thilaka, Sitiawan

=== Centre ===
- FST Panggung Sri Intan, Klang
- FST Coliseum, Kuala Lumpur
- FST Capitol Selayang
- FST Pj State, Petaling Jaya
- FST Metro Plaza, Kajang
- FST 1 Plaza Kuala Selangor
- FST Pawagam Sun, Rawang

=== South ===
- FST Tasek Central, Johor Bharu

=== East Coast ===
- FST Pusat Rekreasi PB Sentral, Kuala Terengganu

=== East Malaysia ===
- FST Harbour Mall, Sandakan

== Five Star Trading ==
Five Star Trading is one of the main distributors of Tamil, Telugu, Hindi and Cantonese films in Malaysia, which includes theatrical distribution (including the 2025 Tamil feature film Madharaasi) and home video (including Video CD, DVD and Video on demand platforms) distribution rights alongside with Infinityram Entertainment Marketing.

== See also ==
- TGV Cinemas
