= MBO Cinemas =

Former cinema chain in Malaysia

- Trade name: MCAT Box Office Sdn Bhd (2003 – May 11, 2021); MBO Cinema Sdn Bhd (December 19, 2021 – March 10, 2026)
- Type: Private Limited Company
- Industry: Media, Entertainment
- Founded: 2003 (original); December 19, 2021 (revival)
- Defunct: May 11, 2021 (original) March 10, 2026 (permanently defunct)
- Fate: Acquired by GSC (original)
- Headquarters: Petaling Jaya, Selangor, Malaysia,
- Number of locations: 10
- Area served: West Malaysia
- Products: Cinemas
- Number of employees: (100+)
- Website: www.mbocinemas.com

MBO Cinema Sdn. Bhd. (trading as MBO Cinemas), also known as MBO for short, was a chain of cinemas in Malaysia. It was the third largest cinema chain in the country after Golden Screen Cinemas and TGV Cinemas. MBO Cinemas went into liquidation in 2020 due to the COVID-19 pandemic. Later in 2021, Golden Screen Cinemas acquired the majority assets of MBO Cinemas. On 19 December, 2021, it was relaunched with new investors under a different management. On March 10, 2026, a poster of closure was found on one of the outlets, stating that it will be closed until further notice. It is then confirmed in an announcement posted by MBO Cinemas on social media platforms on March 11, 2026, stating that it is closed permanently.

MBO Cinemas operated 9 outlets in Peninsular Malaysia located at Atria Shopping Gallery, Space U8, Taiping Sentral Mall, Teluk Intan, Elements Mall Melaka, Melaka Mall, Brem Mall, U-Mall Skudai and Quayside Mall.

== Overview ==
Originally, there were 26 MBO Cinemas branches in Malaysia prior to the revival, with the last branch being the original MBO Cinemas which opened in AEON Mall Bandar Dato' Onn, Johor Bahru.

MBO features special halls, such as BIG SCREEN, MX4D and kid-oriented KECIL. Some of the locations later offered Samsung's Onyx technology display halls. KECIL was the first children-oriented movie hall feature in Malaysia, offering beanie seats, an in-hall playground and is available at 7 MBO Cinemas locations in Malaysia.

== Former locations ==
=== Northern Region ===
Cinema	Total Halls	Seats	Location	State	Remarks
Taiping Sentral	7	1,208	Taiping	Perak	Located on Level 2
Teluk Intan	3	450	Teluk Intan	Perak	Standalone Cinema

=== Central Region ===
Cinema	Total Halls	Seats	Location	State	Remarks
Brem Mall	12	1,810	Kepong	Kuala Lumpur	Located on Level 6
Quayside Mall	8	1,306	Shah Alam	Selangor	Located on Level 2
Harbour Place	8	1,362	Klang	Selangor	Located on Level 7 features Big Screen, Kecil, Premiere, 5 Standard Halls

=== Southern Region ===
Cinema	Total Halls	Seats	Location	State	Remarks
Melaka Mall	7	1,212	Ayer Keroh	Melaka	Located on Level 2
U Mall	5	606	Skudai, Johor Bahru	Johor	Located on Level 1
Elements Mall	10	1,584	Bandar Hilir	Melaka	Located on Level 11 features BIG SCREEN & KECIL

== See also ==
- Lotus Five Star Cinemas
- Golden Screen Cinemas
- Tanjong Golden Village
