= TGV Cinemas =

Cinema chain in Malaysia

TGV Cinemas Sdn Bhd Pawagam TGV (ڤاواݢم تي.جي.ۏي) தி.ஜி.வி சினிமா 丹绒嘉年华
- Type: Private Limited Company
- Industry: Media, Entertainment
- Founded: 28 June 1994
- Headquarters: Maxis Tower, Kuala Lumpur, Malaysia
- Key people: Tan Lay Han(CEO) Shaharul Rezza Hassan (Chairman)
- Products: Cinemas, Film distribution
- Parent: Tanjong PLC
- Website: tgv.com.my

TGV Cinemas Sdn. Bhd. (also known as TGV Pictures, formerly known as Tanjong Golden Village) is the second largest cinema chain in Malaysia. As of May 2024, TGV Cinemas has 43 multiplexes with 325 screens and more than 53,000 seats. TGV Cinemas is headquartered at the Maxis Tower in Kuala Lumpur.

== History ==
Orange Sky Golden Harvest, a cinema operator based in Hong Kong was instrumental in the formation of Tanjong Golden Village, a joint venture with Tanjong of Malaysia and Village Roadshow of Australia. Tanjong bought out the remaining stakes for full ownership. The first TGV cinema in Malaysia opened in 1995 at Bukit Raja Shopping Centre. In 2005, more than 30 cinemas were opened throughout Malaysia. By 2025, TGV Cinemas operates 328 screens in 43 locations throughout Malaysia. The first English movie shown was King Kong, and the second Tamil movie was Anniyan. In 2013, TGV started distributing movies theatrically as TGV Pictures.

TGV Pictures is an independent movie distributor, mostly distributes English, Malay and Indonesian movies. They have also previously released some Asian movies from Japan, Korea, China and Thailand alongside Encore Films, and Starting from 2024 also Released Asian Films Joint Venture New Partnership alongside by Vietnamese Based Mockingbird Pictures.

== See also ==
- Golden Screen Cinemas
- MBO Cinemas
- Lotus Five Star
