= AWL Agri Business =

Indian consumer goods company

- Type: Public
- Traded as: BSE: 543458; NSE: AWL
- ISIN: INE699H01024
- Industry: FMCG
- Founded: 1999
- Founder: Gautam Adani
- Headquarters: Ahmedabad, India
- Area served: Worldwide
- Key people: Dorab Erach Mistry (Chairman); Angshu Mallick (CEO); Shrikant Kanhere (CFO); Deesha Trivedi (Company Secretary)
- Products: Cooking oil; Rice; Pulses; Flour; Sugar; Soyabean Foods; Soap; Sanitizer; Poha; Khichdi
- Brands: Fortune; Kohinoor
- Revenue: ▲₹75,148 crore (US$7.8 billion) (2026)
- Operating income: ▼₹1,393 crore (US$140 million) (2026)
- Net income: ▼₹1,045 crore (US$110 million) (2026)
- Total assets: ▲₹24,758 crore (US$2.6 billion) (2026)
- Total equity: ▲₹10,444 crore (US$1.1 billion) (2026)
- Number of employees: ~2678 (2024)
- Parent: Wilmar International (57%)
- Website: www.awl.in

AWL Agri Business, formerly Adani Wilmar, is an Indian multinational food and beverage conglomerate based in Ahmedabad. The company was founded in 1999 as a joint venture between Adani Enterprises and Wilmar International. It is India's largest processor of edible oils. As of 2025, AWL operates 24 plants across 11 states in India and exports its products to more than 50 countries.

== History ==
Adani Wilmar Ltd. was incorporated in 1999 as an equal joint venture between Adani Enterprises and Singapore-based Wilmar International.

Adani Wilmar's brand, Fortune, is an edible oils and foods brand. Between 2014 and 2017, the company launched other packaged products, such as rice, soya chunks, and flour, under the same brand name. Between 2019 and 2020, the company entered the personal care market under the brand Alife. During the same period, AWL also ventured into the ready-to-cook (RTC) products market. As of 2021, the company held an 18.3% market share in the branded edible oil market in India. It is India's largest processor of palm oil.

Adani Wilmar opened its three-day initial public offering (IPO) on 27 January 2022, and the issue closed on 31 January 2022. The listing took place on 8 February 2022.

In December 2024, Adani Enterprises announced that it would exit the Adani Wilmar joint venture by selling its 44% stake to public shareholders and Wilmar International. Adani Enterprises exited the company in November 2025 after the completion of the stake sale.

In February 2025, Adani Wilmar was renamed as AWL Agri Business Limited following the approval of its shareholders.

== Subsidiary, acquisition & joint ventures ==
In 1993, BEOL (Bangladesh Edible Oil Limited) was established in Dhaka, Bangladesh, as a 100% foreign-owned joint venture between Wilmar International of Singapore and the Adani Group of India.

In 2005, Adani Wilmar acquired the Mantralayam and Haldia plants (refining). From 2006 to 2009, AWL acquired multiple crushing and refining units in Bundi, Shujalpur, Nagpur, and Neemuch. It also acquired Rajshri Packagers (refining), Acalmar Oils and Fats, and Satya Sai Agroils (refining). In 2011, the AWL group acquired the Alwar and Mundra castor units (crushing, refining, and industry essentials) and Gokul Refoils & Solvent (edible oil refining company). In 2018, the AWL group acquired a refinery from Louis Dreyfus Commodities, an edible oil refinery from Cargill, and rice plants from Ferozepur Foods. Joint ventures of AWL include KOG-KTV Foods Pvt. Ltd, KTV Health Foods Pvt. Ltd, and Visakha Polyfab Pvt. Ltd.

In 2022, Adani Wilmar acquired the Kohinoor, Trophy Royale, and Charminar rice brands from McCormick & Company.

In 2024, Adani Wilmar acquired a 67% stake in the specialty chemicals company Omkar Chemical Industries.

== Social responsibility ==
Adani Wilmar Limited, along with the Adani Foundation, the CSR arm of the Adani Group, runs the Fortune SuPoshan initiative to address malnutrition and anemia in children.

== Criticism and controversies ==
In 2016, the Government of Maharashtra released an official statement indicating that Adani Wilmar had violated regulations set by the Food and Drug Administration (FDA) of Maharashtra while promoting its blended edible vegetable oil, Fortune Vivo. The company had made claims about the oil's medicinal properties, including its ability to regulate diabetes. Madan Yerawar, the Minister of State for FDA, stated that a raid was conducted on Adani Wilmar's storage facility in Panvel after deceptive information was identified on both the product advertisements and packaging.

Adani Wilmar, along with other members of the Roundtable on Sustainable Palm Oil, has been criticized for its role in deforestation and the loss of habitat for orangutans, tigers, and elephants in the Sumatra and Borneo regions of Indonesia and Malaysia. The nonprofit Adani Watch states that "through its joint venture with Wilmar, Adani is a major refiner and trader in palm oil, an industry responsible for devastating large areas of rainforest in Southeast Asia."

In June 2022, C4ADS stated in its report that food companies, including Adani Wilmar, "continue to enable forced labor through their indiscriminate import of tainted palm oil."

On 9 February 2023, the Himachal Pradesh Excise Department raided the company's warehouses in the state.

In February 2023, Adani Wilmar's joint venture with KTV Group was penalized by the Supreme Court of India for violations of coastal regulations in Tamil Nadu. The company had constructed an oil storage facility and pipeline, and local fishermen claimed that oil leaks from the 7-kilometer pipeline were killing fish in the area. The court ordered that the facility be demolished.
