= Paradigm Mall, Petaling Jaya =

Shopping mall in Petaling Jaya, Selangor, Malaysia

Coordinates: 3°06′18.3″N 101°35′45.4″E

Paradigm Mall
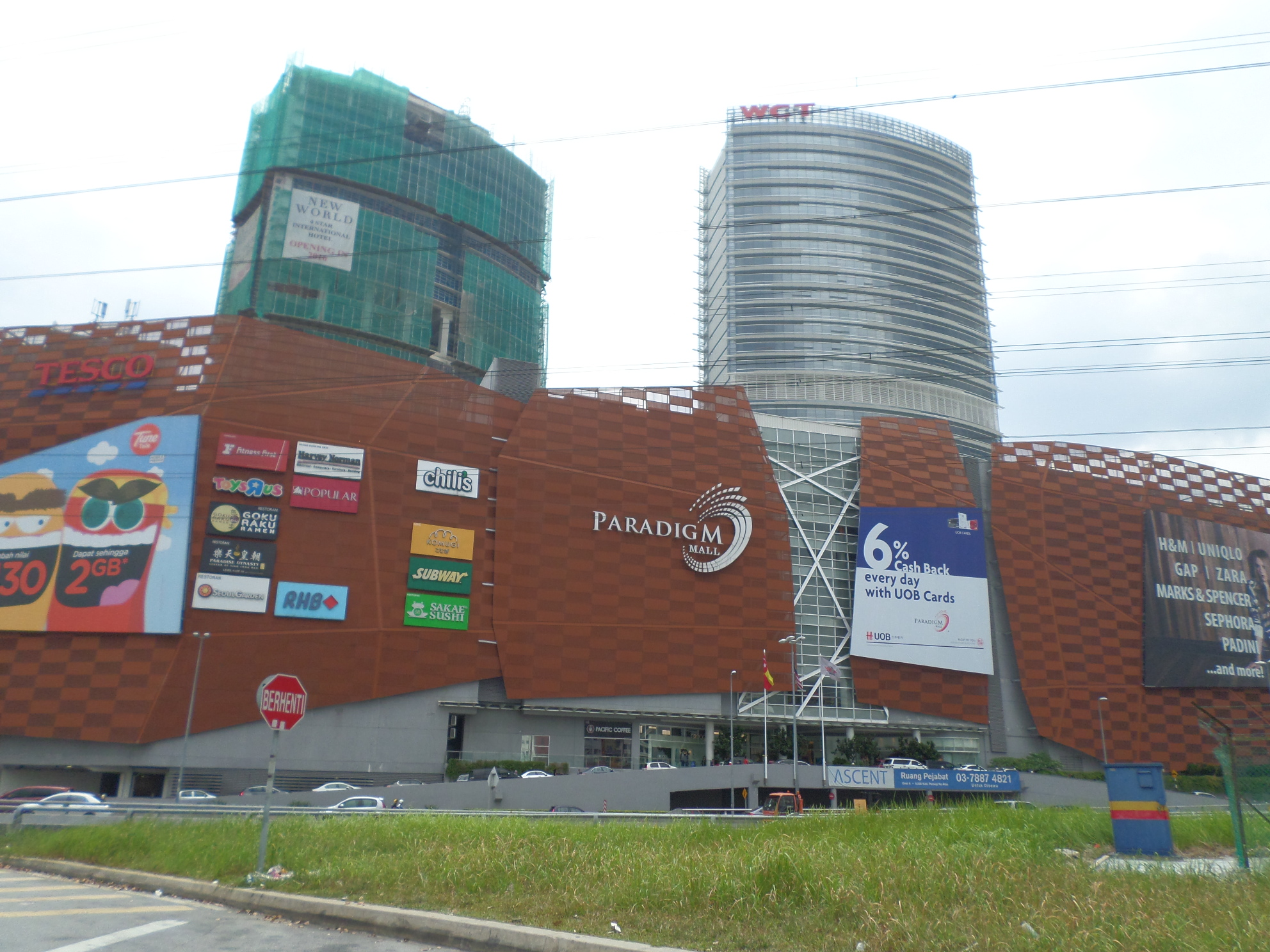
- Location: Petaling Jaya, Selangor, Malaysia
- Opened: 2012
- Website: https://paradigmmall.com.my/

Paradigm Mall is a shopping mall located in Petaling Jaya, Selangor, Malaysia. Owned by WCT Group, it started operations in 2012. It is the second mall project developed by WCT. The mall has more than 300 retail spaces, 6-levels with 700,000 sqft that is catered for youth and young families.
