= Imago KK Times Square =

Shopping mall in Kota Kinabalu, Sabah, Malaysia

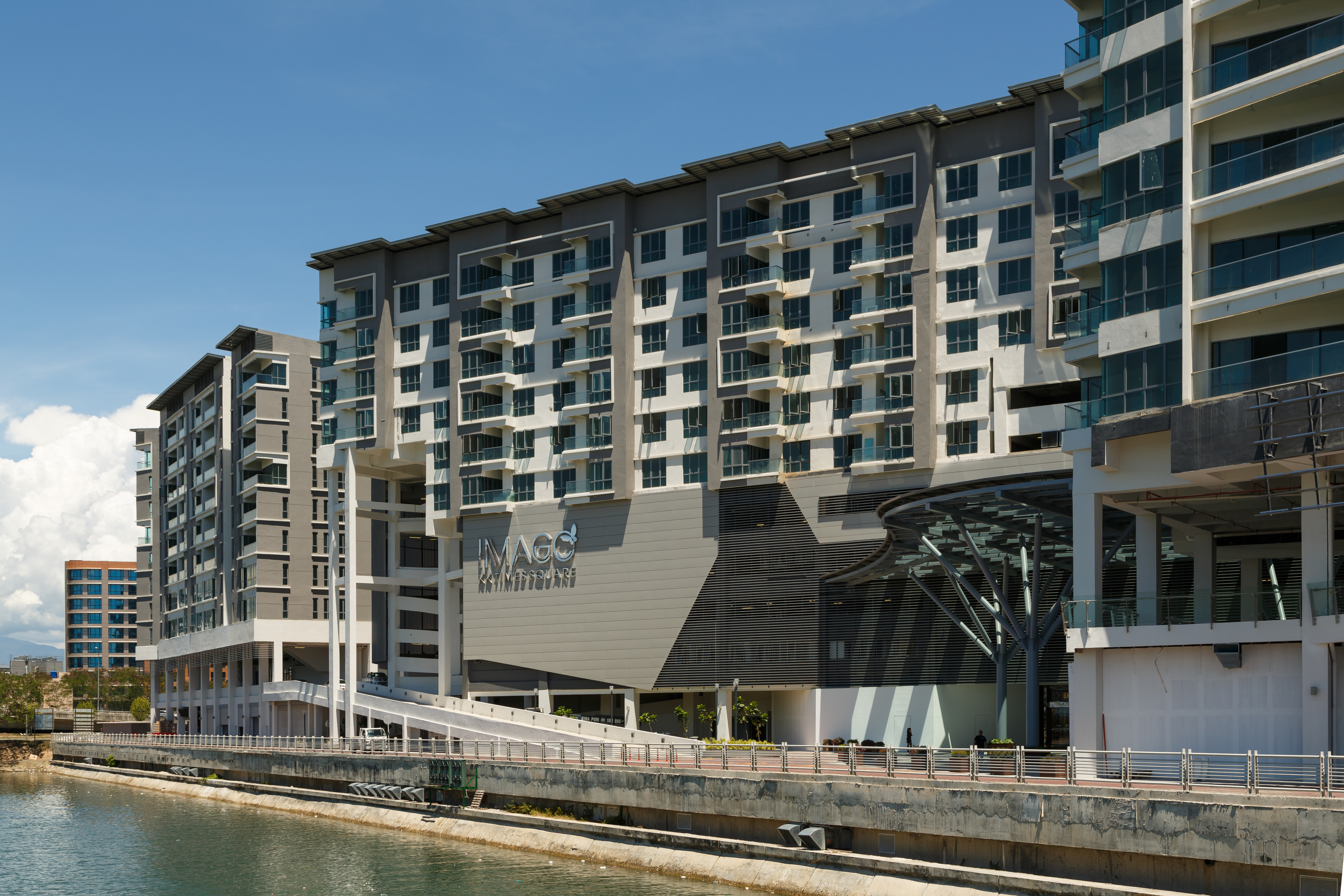
- Location: Kota Kinabalu, Sabah, Malaysia
- Coordinates: 5°58′14″N 116°3′59″E
- Address: Imago KK Times Square Phase 2, Off Jalan Coastal, 88100 Kota Kinabalu, Sabah, Malaysia.
- Opened: 28 March 2015; 11 years ago
- Developer: Asian Pac Holdings Berhad
- Manager: Syarikat Kapasi Sdn. Bhd.
- Owner: Syarikat Kapasi Sdn. Bhd.
- Num. of stores: 300
- Floor area: 800,000 sq. ft. (74322 sq. m)
- Floors: 4
- Website: imago.my

Imago KK Times Square Shopping Mall ("Imago"; Chinese: 我格广场; pinyin: wǒgéguǎngchǎng) is a shopping mall located at the city center of Kota Kinabalu, Sabah, Malaysia. It was developed and managed by Syarikat Kapasi Sdn. Bhd., which is a wholly owned subsidiary of Asian Pac Holdings Berhad, a company listed on the Main Board of the Kuala Lumpur Stock Exchange. Imago was opened on 28 March 2015.

Imago is a super regional mall with a total floor space of approximately 1,400,000 sq. ft. (130,000 sq. m.) and a net retail area of about 800,000 sq. ft. (74,320 sq. m.) of non-stratified lease-only retail space. It spans four levels (basement, ground, first and second floors) and encompasses a tenant composition of around 300 tenants that covers the department store, supermarket, fashion and accessories, along with dining outlets, cafes and bars.

== History ==
The mall was first named "KK Times Square Mall". It was then named "Imago" to symbolize the arrival of a lease-only shopping mall that will supposedly have proper trade and a tenant mix. This phase was later dubbed the "Vision" phase, as in 2012 the mall finally underwent full-scale layout planning and tenant planning.

The second major pre-opening event for Imago was in 2014, named "Metamorphosis", where a signing ceremony with anchor tenants was conducted in Kuala Lumpur, Malaysia, with brands such as Michael Kors, Coach and Parkson becoming part of Imago's tenant.

=== Emergence ===
One week before Imago was opened, the developer of Imago – Asian Pac Holdings Berhad, together with Malaysia's Unit Kerjasama Awam Swasta (UKAS) of the Prime Minister's Office, launched the newly completed 6-lane "New Link Bridge", a public–private partnership project that connects Jalan New Link with Jalan Tun Fuad Stephens (to the north-east) and Jalan Coastal (to the south-west). It was intended to further connect the KK Times Square development with the rest of the city.

Imago was originally slated to open in late 2014, in time for Christmas. The opening was delayed, and it eventually opened on 28 March 2015 by the then Deputy Chief Minister of Sabah, Raymond Tan Shu Kiah. The launching ceremony was conducted at The Oval (central atrium), ground floor of Imago, and the theme of the event was "Emergence" to symbolize the "final phase of transformation into a fully-developed and completed" shopping mall.

== Management ==
The management of Imago is directly under the wholly owned subsidiaries of Asian Pac Holdings Berhad:

- Mall ownership and management: Syarikat Kapasi Sdn. Bhd.;
- Facility management: Asian Pac Property Management Sdn. Bhd.

== Location ==
Imago is part of the larger Kota Kinabalu Times Square ("KK Times Square") development, comprising the Signature Office, The Loft Residence, and the Imago. The entire development is located in the south-west section of Kota Kinabalu city.

== Zones ==
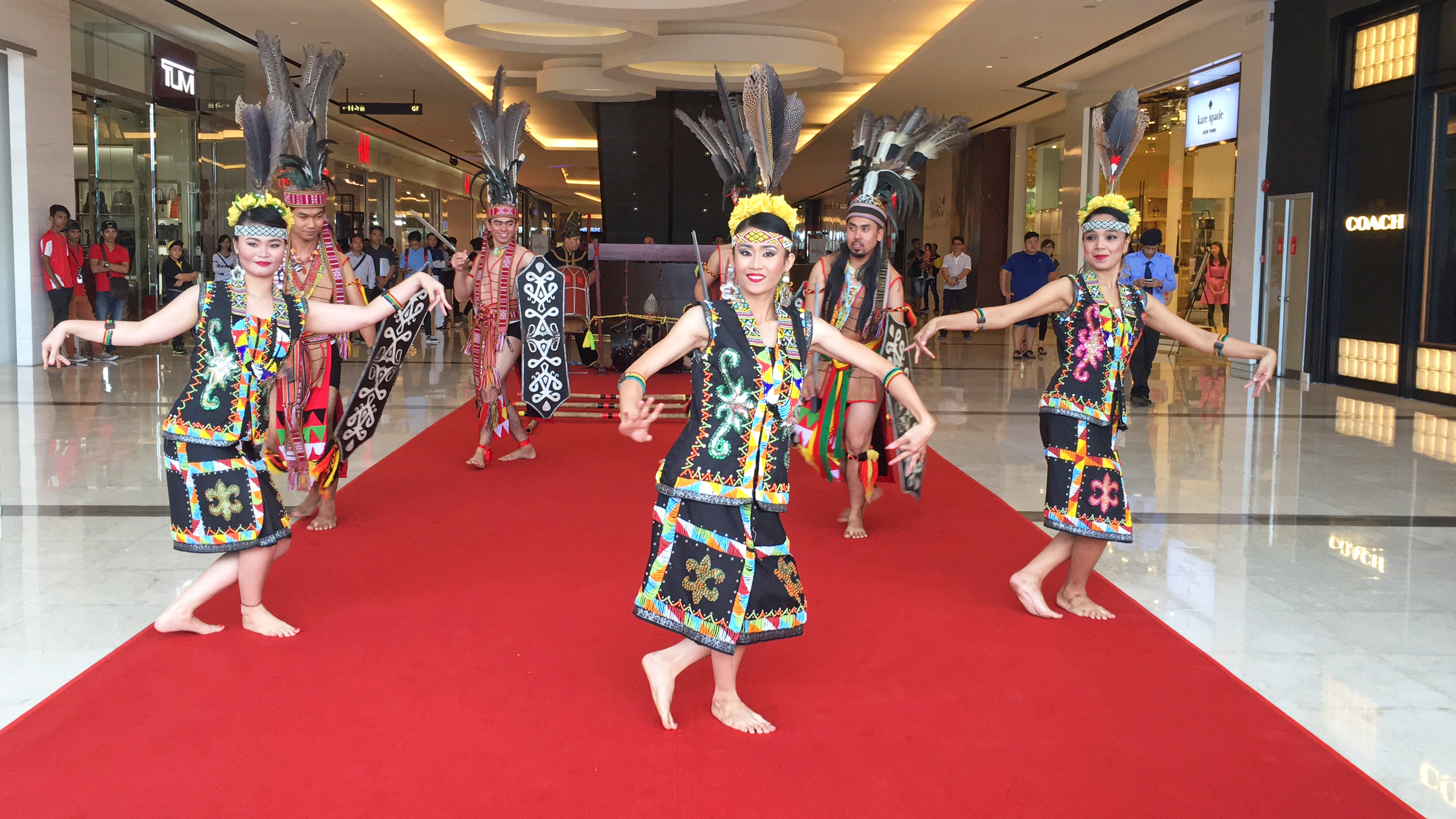
Imago KK Times Square – Welcome Point's dance

There are several zones in Imago that are a smaller part of the entire floor.

Pret-a-Gouter is located in the basement floor of Imago, and it is composed of mainly food-related kiosks and outlets.

Welcome Point is located on the ground floor of Imago in front of the Concierge near the South Entrance, which is also the main drop-off point. Traditional cultural performances are conducted every day at regular intervals from noon to 8:00 pm. A common performance that can be seen here is the Magunatip bamboo dance.

Aramaiti is located to the north of the mall on the ground floor of Imago in a semi-outdoor alfresco area also called "Street Walk". The term "aramaiti" is a local Kadazan-Dusun language term that means "to celebrate". It includes restaurants and bars. The area also has a landscaped boulevard with water features.

Heritage Food Street is a food court in Imago and is located on the second floor. It is designed to be a very British colonial-style space. It uses the marble-top tables and stools commonly found in old Chinese cafes in Malaysia.

== Events and activities ==
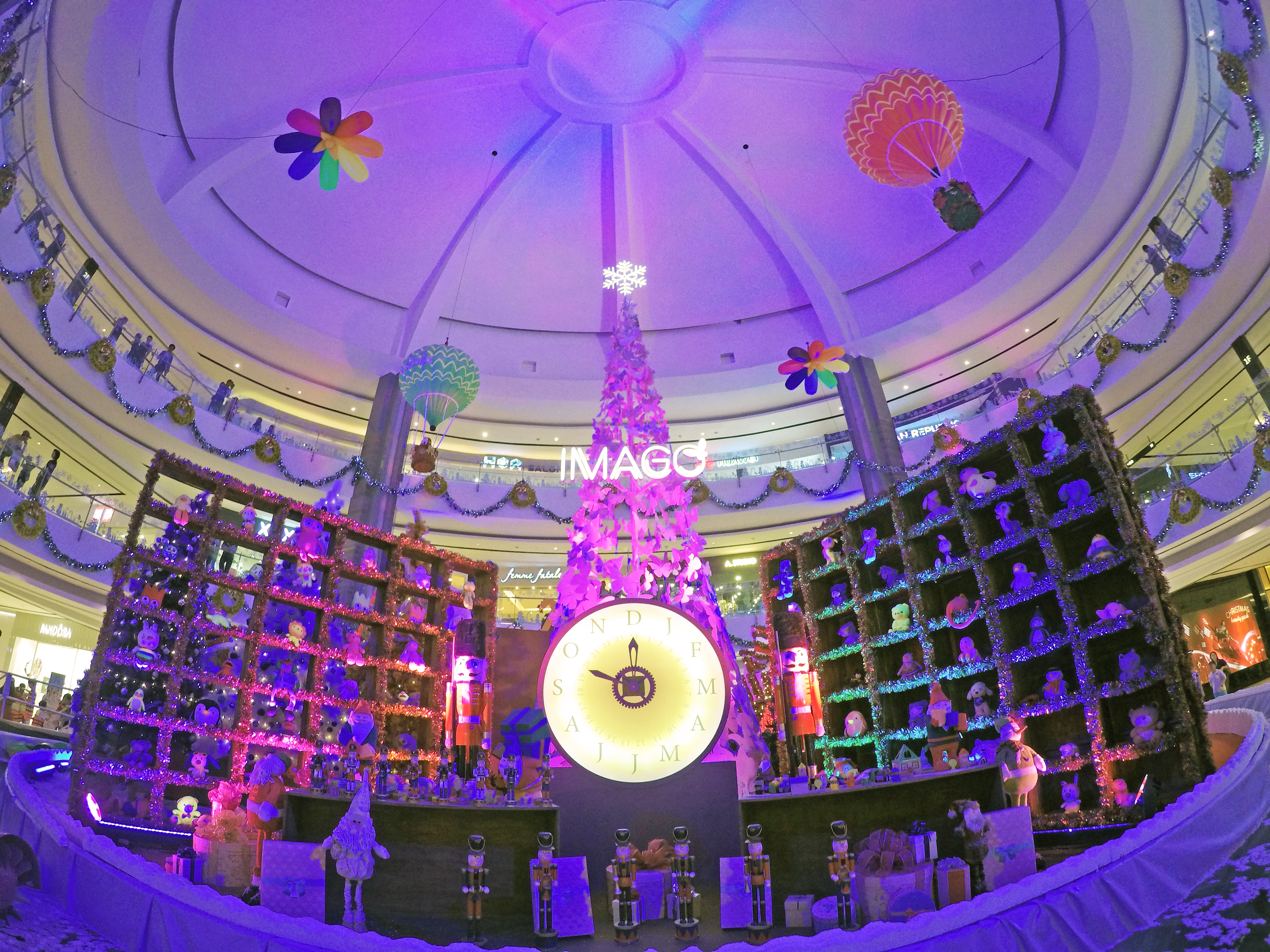
IMAGO Christmas 2017

Imago holds events and activities during the usual Malaysian festive periods such as Chinese New Year, Kaamatan (Harvest Festival), Hari Raya Aidilfitri, Mid-Autumn Festival, Deepavali and Christmas. In Halloween, they have traditionally built haunted houses at the central atrium; shoppers can go into them and find a way to escape.

== Awards ==
Imago has received several awards and won mall-related competitions.

- Sabah Tourism Awards: 2017 Best Shopping Complex.
- Malaysia Book of Records: Tallest Rotating Christmas Tree (Christmas 2018 – Bedazzled).
- Sabah Tourism Awards: 2019 Best Shopping Experience.

== Charity and sponsorship ==
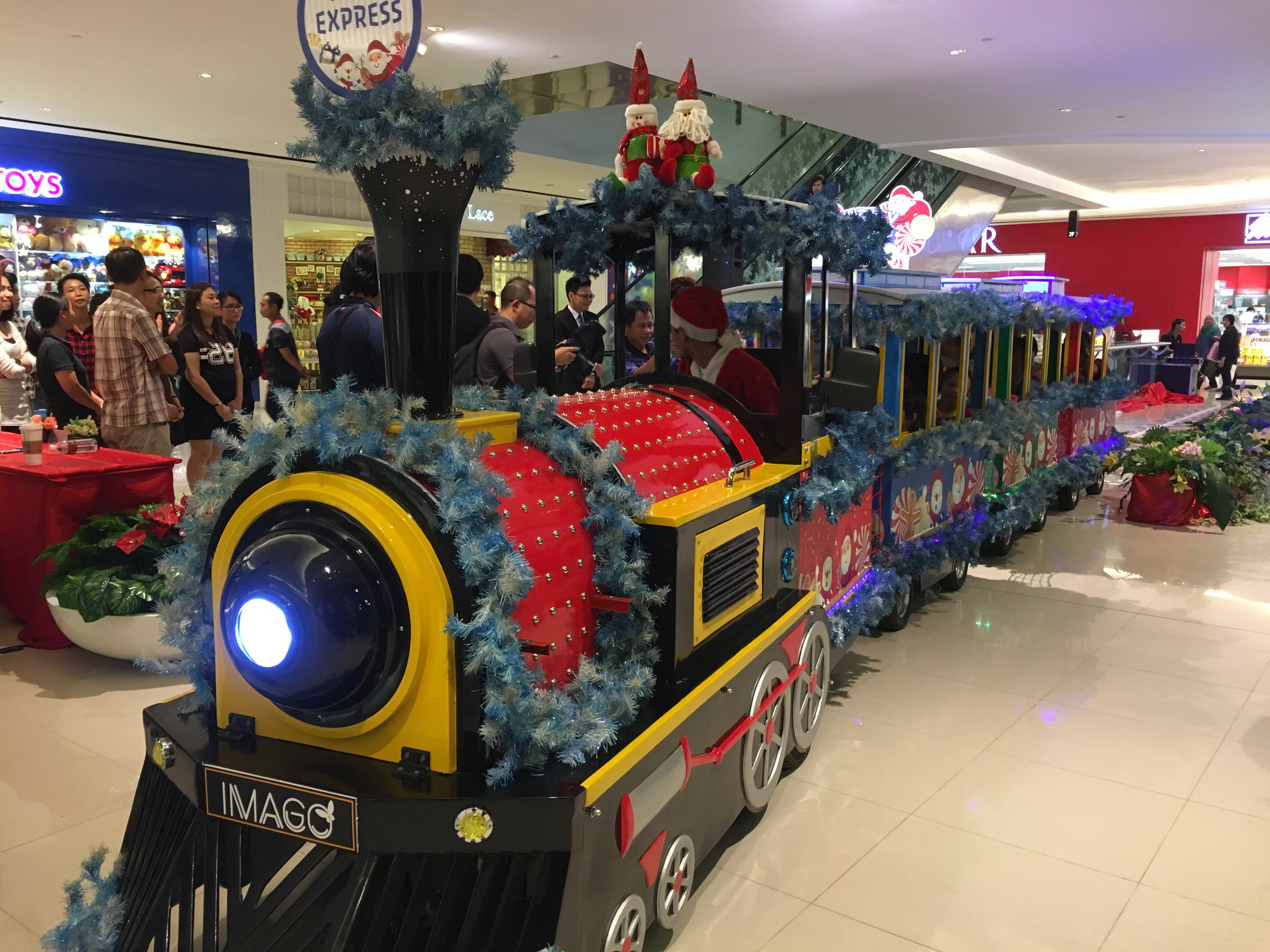
Imago Hope Express

=== Hope Express ===
Imago started a charity initiative on its "Once Upon A Dream" Christmas event in December 2016. The charity campaign Hope Express involved an indoor train ride around the mall on the second floor. The collections were donated in full to the Sabah Cheshire Home charity organisation.

=== Sponsorship ===
Imago also carried out many sponsorship programs with organisations and government agencies. These organisations and agencies include:

- United Nations Educations, Scientific and Cultural Organization (UNESCO);
- Sabah Tourism Board;
- Queen Elizabeth Hospital, Kota Kinabalu, Sabah, Malaysia;
- Royal Malaysia Police;
- Kota Kinabalu City Hall; and
- Consulate General of The People's Republic of China (Kota Kinabalu).

== See also ==
- List of shopping malls in Malaysia
