= Robert Kuok =

Malaysian billionaire business magnate (born 1923)

- 郭鹤年
- Born: Kuok Hock Nien; 6 October 1923 (age 103); Johor Bahru, Johor, Unfederated Malay States, British Malaya (now Malaysia)
- Education: Raffles Institution
- Occupations: Business magnate, investor, philanthropist
- Known for: Malaysia's richest person
- Title: Founder and chairman of Shangri-La Hotels and Resorts
- Spouse(s): Joyce Cheah (谢碧蓉) (deceased); Pauline Ho Poh Lin (何宝莲)
- Children: 8
- Relatives: Kuok Khoon Hong (first cousin once removed)

Chinese name
- Traditional Chinese: 郭鶴年
- Simplified Chinese: 郭鹤年
Transcriptions
Standard Mandarin
- Hanyu Pinyin: Guō Hènián

Robert Kuok Hock Nien, (Note: simplified Chinese: 郭鹤年; traditional Chinese: 郭鶴年; pinyin: Guō Hènián; Foochow Romanized: Guóh Hŏk-nièng) better known as Robert Kuok, (born 6 October 1923) is a Malaysian business magnate, investor and philanthropist based in Hong Kong since 1973. According to Forbes, his net worth is estimated at $11.8 billion as of April 2023, making him the wealthiest Malaysian citizen and 96th wealthiest person in the world. As of April 2023, according to the Bloomberg Billionaires Index 2023, Kuok has an estimated net worth of $17.7 billion, making him the 97th richest person in the world.

Although Kuok is a major figure in business circles in East and Southeast Asia, he has remained media shy and maintains a low public profile despite his massive business success and immense wealth, with most of his companies being privately held by him or his family members. Apart from presiding the ownership over a multitude of businesses spread across numerous industries in the Malaysian economic landscape, his companies have investments in many countries throughout Continental Asia.

His business interests (collectively known as the Kuok Group of Companies) range from sugarcane plantations (Perlis Plantations Bhd), sugar refineries, flour milling, animal feed, oil, mining, financial services, hotel (Shangri-La Hotels and Resorts), real estate (Kerry Properties), trading, freight shipping (Kerry Logistics) and publishing. The biggest source of wealth that has contributed to his private fortune is a stake in the Singaporean company Wilmar International, the world's largest listed palm oil trader company. For three months in 2018, Kuok was appointed to the Council of Eminent Persons as an advisor during Mahathir Mohamad's second stint as prime minister.

== Early life ==
Kuok was born on 6 October 1923 in Johor Bahru during British colonial rule to a wealthy Malayan Chinese family with origins from Fuzhou (Hokchew). He was named after Robert the Bruce, and was enrolled at an English-medium primary school by his father's English-speaking clerk. Kuok's father, Kuok Keng Kang (1893–1948), had left the Qing dynasty in 1909 and arrived in Singapore from Fuzhou (Hokchew), which is now part of Fujian in China. Robert was the youngest of three brothers born to his father and his mother Zheng Ge Ru. He grew up speaking his parents' Fuzhou language, English and later Japanese during the Japanese occupation of Malaya and Singapore in World War II. He also studied at English College Johore Bahru for his secondary education and later at Raffles Institution in Singapore where he was classmates with Lee Kuan Yew, the founding father of Singapore and the country's first prime minister.

== Career ==
=== Early 20th century ===
According to Kuok himself, he began his business career as an office boy, and later started a business from scratch with financial backing coming from his relatives. Upon graduation, it was World War II and he became a collaborator, working as a clerk in the rice-trading department of the Japanese industrial conglomerate Mitsubishi during the Japanese occupation of Singapore between 1942 and 1945. Mitsubishi, with the help of the Kempeitai, monopolised the rice trade in Malaya during the occupation period. He was soon promoted to head the rice-trading department. After the war, he took the skills he learned from the occupying force to the family's business in Johor.

After the senior Kuok died in 1948, Kuok and his two brothers and a cousin, Kuok Hock Chin founded Kuok Brothers Sdn Bhd in 1949, trading agricultural commodities. Kuok's relationship with the Japanese continued after Malaya gained independence. In 1959, Kuok formed Malayan Sugar Manufacturing Co. Bhd. together with two prominent Japanese partners. He also brought many influential Malay elites into his company as directors and shareholders, including politicians and royalty. In 1961, he bought cheap sugar from India before the prices shot up, and continued to invest heavily in sugar refineries, at one time controlling 80% of the Malaysian sugar market with production of 1.5 million tonnes, equivalent to 10% of world production, earning himself the nickname "Sugar King of Asia" in the process.

=== Late 20th century ===
In 1971, he built the first Shangri-La Hotel in Singapore; with land acquired through Petaling Garden Berhad, a Malaysian based developer. His first foray into Hong Kong property was in 1977, when he acquired a plot of land on the newly reclaimed Tsim Sha Tsui East waterfront, where he built his second hotel, the Kowloon Shangri-La. In 1993, his Kerry Group acquired a 34.9% stake in the South China Morning Post from Murdoch's News Corporation. Kuok officially retired from the Kerry Group on 1 April 1993.

His companies have investments in many countries, including Singapore, the Philippines, Thailand, Mainland China, Indonesia, Fiji, and Australia. Businesses in China include 10 bottling companies for Coca-Cola and the ownership of the Beijing World Trade Centre. His company's freight shipping interests include Malaysian Bulk Carriers Berhad and Transmile Group.

=== 21st century ===
In 2007, Kuok merged his plantations, edible oil, and grain businesses with Wilmar International, making it the world's biggest palm-oil processor.

On 31 October 2009, the PPB Group under the flagship of Robert Kuok issued a statement to the Bursa Malaysia that it had decided to dispose of its sugar units along with land used to cultivate sugar cane for RM 1.29 billion to FELDA. The sales resulted in a one-off gain for the company.

In February 2014, PACC Offshore Services Holdings (POSH), a Singaporean-based oil services operator owned by Kuok started pre-IPO talks with investors to list on the Singapore Stock Exchange to raise $400 million.

== Politics ==
His political influence is attested by his selection as one of the Hong Kong Affairs Advisors in the run-up to the transfer of sovereignty over Hong Kong, and his minority stake in CITIC Pacific. He was also instrumental in conveying information and setting up the meetings between Malaysian and Chinese governments leading to full diplomatic cross recognition of the two countries.

On 12 May 2018, in the aftermath of the Malaysian general election that year where Mahathir Mohamad returned as prime minister of Malaysia, Kuok was appointed to the five-member Council of Eminent Persons along with Tun Daim Zainuddin, Tan Sri Datuk Seri Zeti Akhtar Aziz, Tan Sri Hassan Marican and Jomo Kwame Sundaram to advise the Pakatan Harapan (PH) federal government. The council was dissolved on 17 August 2018.

== Personal life ==
Kuok is a follower of Buddhism. Kuok has been married twice. His first wife was Joyce Cheah and his second wife is Pauline Ho Poh Lin. He has eight children from the marriages. His son, Kuok Khoon Ean born in 1955 married Kuok Cheng Sui and holds a bachelor's degree in economics from the University of Nottingham, England. His other son, Kuok Khoon Ho is the chairman of Kuok Brothers, born in 1951 and holds a bachelor's degree from McGill University, Canada. Kuok Hui Kwong, his daughter, was previously the managing director and chief executive of SCMP Group and chairperson of Shangri-La Asia. One of his sons, Kuok Khoon Ean, handles most of the day-to-day operations of his businesses. He resides in Kuala Lumpur. During the reign of Iskandar of Johor as the King of Malaysia, Kuok was offered a "Yang Berbahagia Tan Sri" title (comparable to Sir), but rejected the offer.

Kuok's brother, Philip Kuok Hock Khee was a former Malaysian Ambassador to Germany, Yugoslavia, Netherlands, Belgium, Luxembourg and Denmark. Philip married Eileen Kuok and had two sons and two daughters. Philip Kuok died in 2003. Another brother, William Kuok Hock Ling, was a member of the Malayan Communist Party and was killed during the Malayan Emergency in 1952. According to his memoir, Kuok described that of all the brothers, his mother Zheng Ge Ru doted on and adored William the most, and was heartbroken when she received news of his death.

His nephew, Kuok Khoon Hong is the chairman of Wilmar International, and one of the richest people in Singapore. Kuok Khoon Hong's father, Kuok Hock Swee, was an older cousin of Robert Kuok. His grand-nephew, Kuok Meng Ru, is in the music retail industry, owning Swee Lee music company.

He lives in the Deep Water Bay neighbourhood on Hong Kong Island. In 2023, Kuok became a centenarian.

== Bibliography ==
In March 2018, Kuok published a book about his life entitled, Robert Kuok: A Memoir. It won Best Book of the Year at the Singapore Book Publishers Association awards 2018.

- Robert Kuok: A Memoir (2018) ISBN 978-981-4189-73-6
