= Ipoh Parade =

Shopping mall in Ipoh, Perak, Malaysia

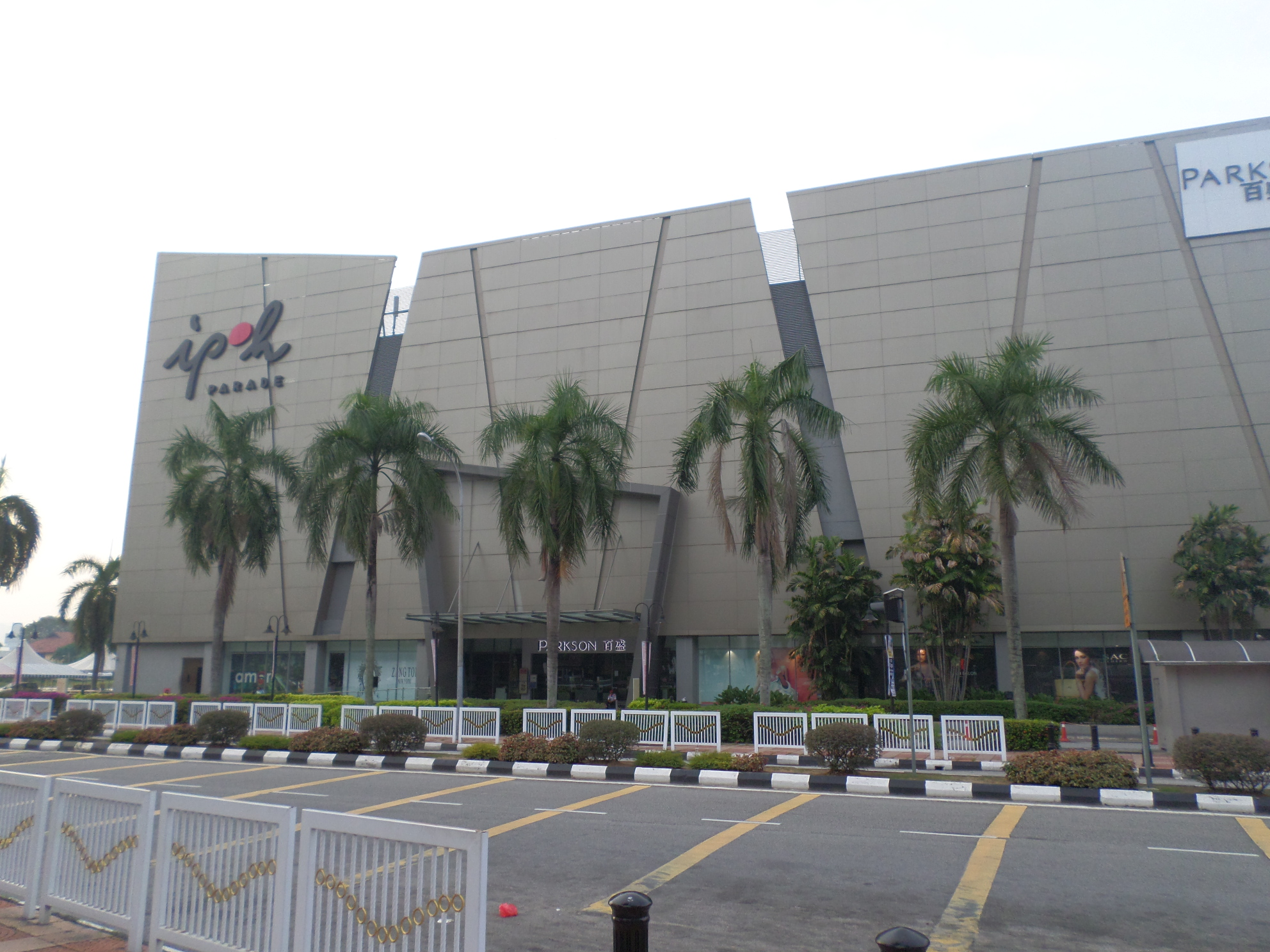
- Ipoh Parade.
- Location: Ipoh, Perak, Malaysia
- Coordinates: 4°35′47″N 101°05′24″E
- Address: 105, Jalan Sultan Abdul Jalil, 31350 Ipoh, Perak
- Owner: ARA Harmony III
- Architect: Darryl Yamamoto
- Num. of stores: 220 units as of 1 January 2024
- Floor area: 1,485,721 square feet (138,028 m^{2}) as of 1 January 2024
- Floors: 5
- Website: https://www.ipoh.parade.com.my

Ipoh Parade is a mall in Ipoh, Perak, Malaysia with anchor tenants such as Parkson, Golden Screen Cinemas, Jaya Grocer, Guardian and Mr DIY. It was built and operated by the Lion Group in 1994. The mall was sold to ARA Asia Dragon Fund in 2012 and was closed in late 2013 to 2014 for a major refurbishment. It is now owned by ARA Harmony III and managed by ARA Asset Management Limited (ARA). As of 1 January 2024, the mall's net lettable area (NLA) of 626,262 sq. ft. sq. ft. and it is reported to be 98.7% tenanted.

== Background ==
Ipoh Parade was the first modern mall in the historic town of Ipoh. The mall underwent a major refurbishment in 2013 and was reopened in 2014. The mall has karaoke booths, bowling alleys, laser tag centres, and GSC cineplex (the largest in Perak) that includes a GSC BIG theatre. It also includes a childcare facility for mothers and a prayer hall for Muslims.

The mall has played host to large community-based events such as the annual Shuddup N’ Dance, Cosplay, Diabolo Masters Championship and Lion Dance competitions attended by local and regional participants.

== Award won ==
- Malaysia Book of Record as the "Biggest Outdoor LED Advertising Screen".

== Access ==
=== Buses ===
Ipoh Parade is accessible via the Route 116 (Terminal Amanjaya) bus service.
