= List of shopping malls in Malaysia =

This is a list of shopping malls in Malaysia.

(Note: ÆON BiG, Billion, Econsave, TF Value-Mart, NSK Wholesale Market, Giant Hypermarket, Mydin, Emporium, Servay, KIPMall, Sunshine and Lotus's are categorised as hypermarkets and these will not be listed in this article.)

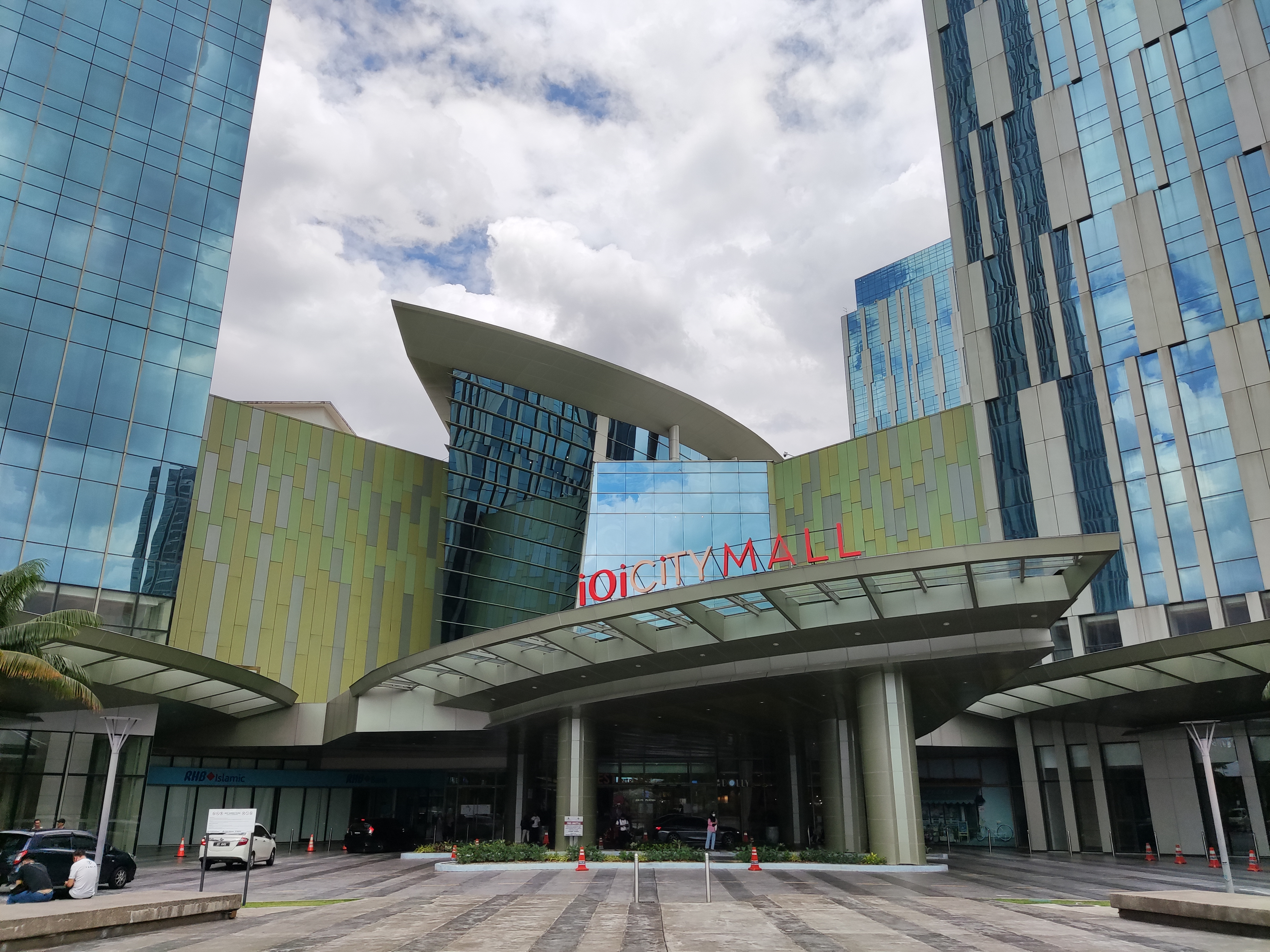
IOI City Mall in the Sepang District section of Putrajaya. It is the largest mall in Malaysia and Southeast Asia with over 2,500,000 sq ft (230,000 m^{2}) of area and 800 stores.

== Kuala Lumpur ==
Mid Valley Megamall

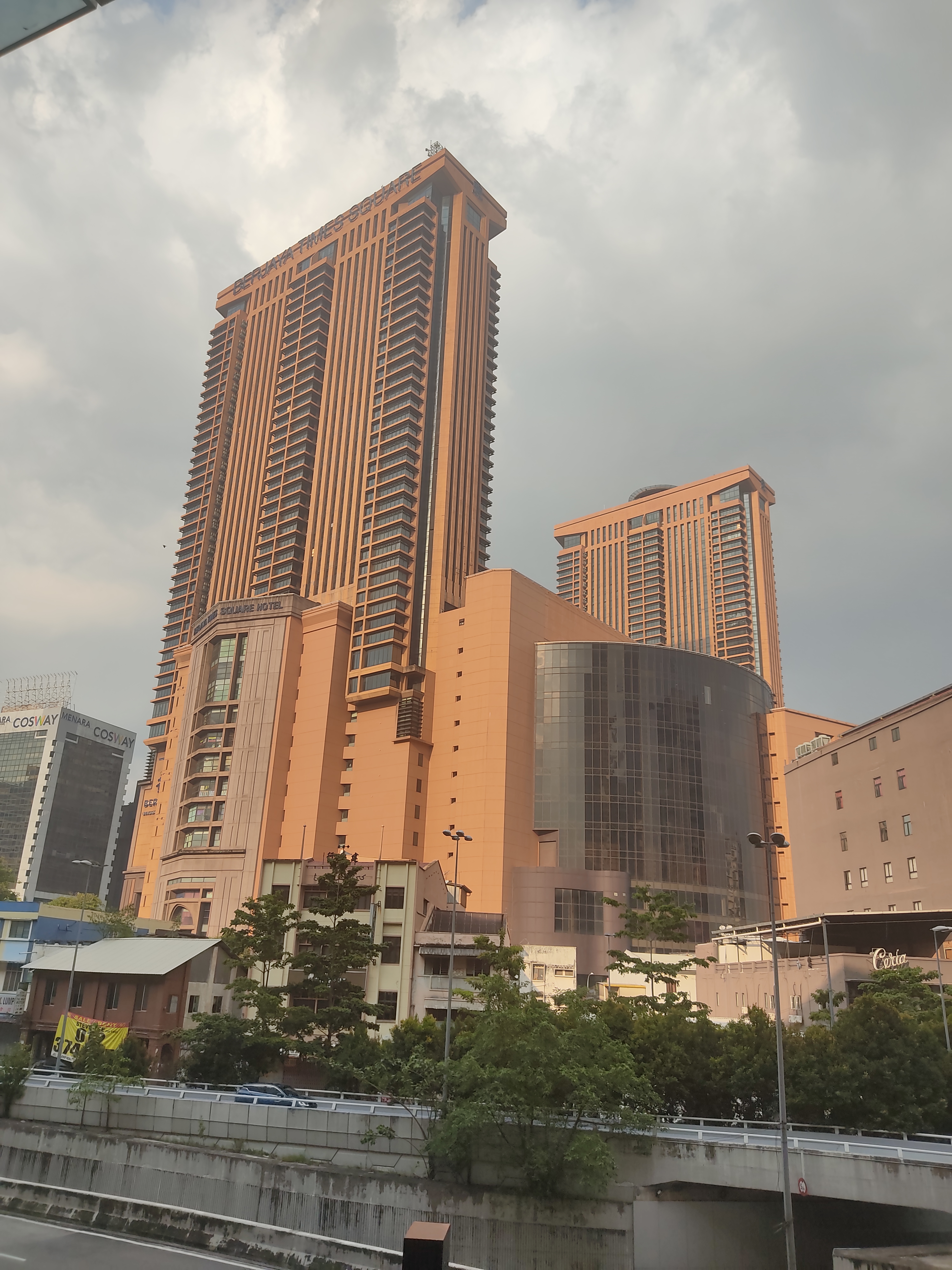
Berjaya Times Square

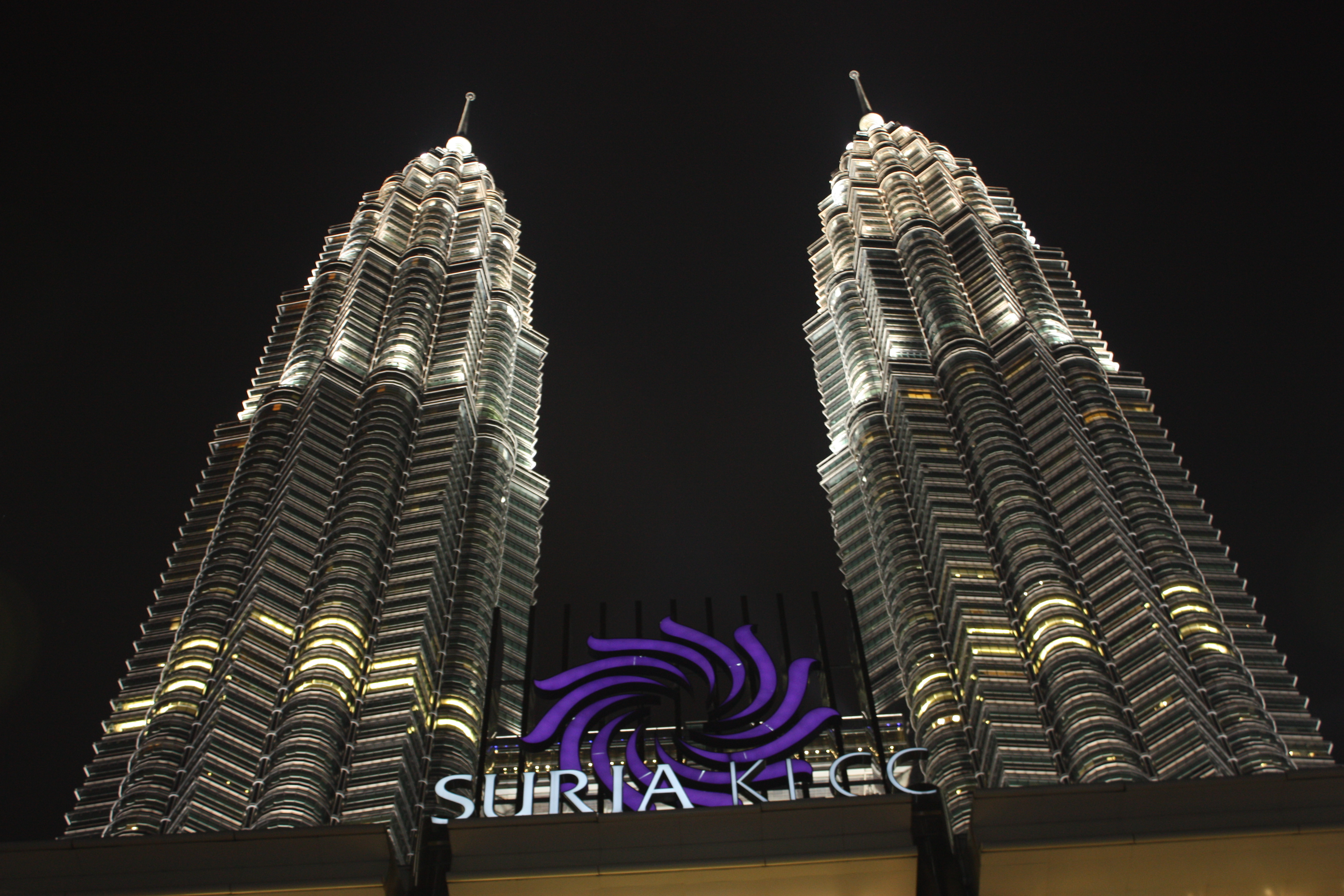
Suria KLCC

=== Jalan Ampang ===
- Great Eastern Mall
- Ampang Park (permanently closed/demolished)

=== Bangsar ===
- Bangsar Shopping Centre
- Bangsar Village I & II

=== Brickfields ===
- NU Sentral

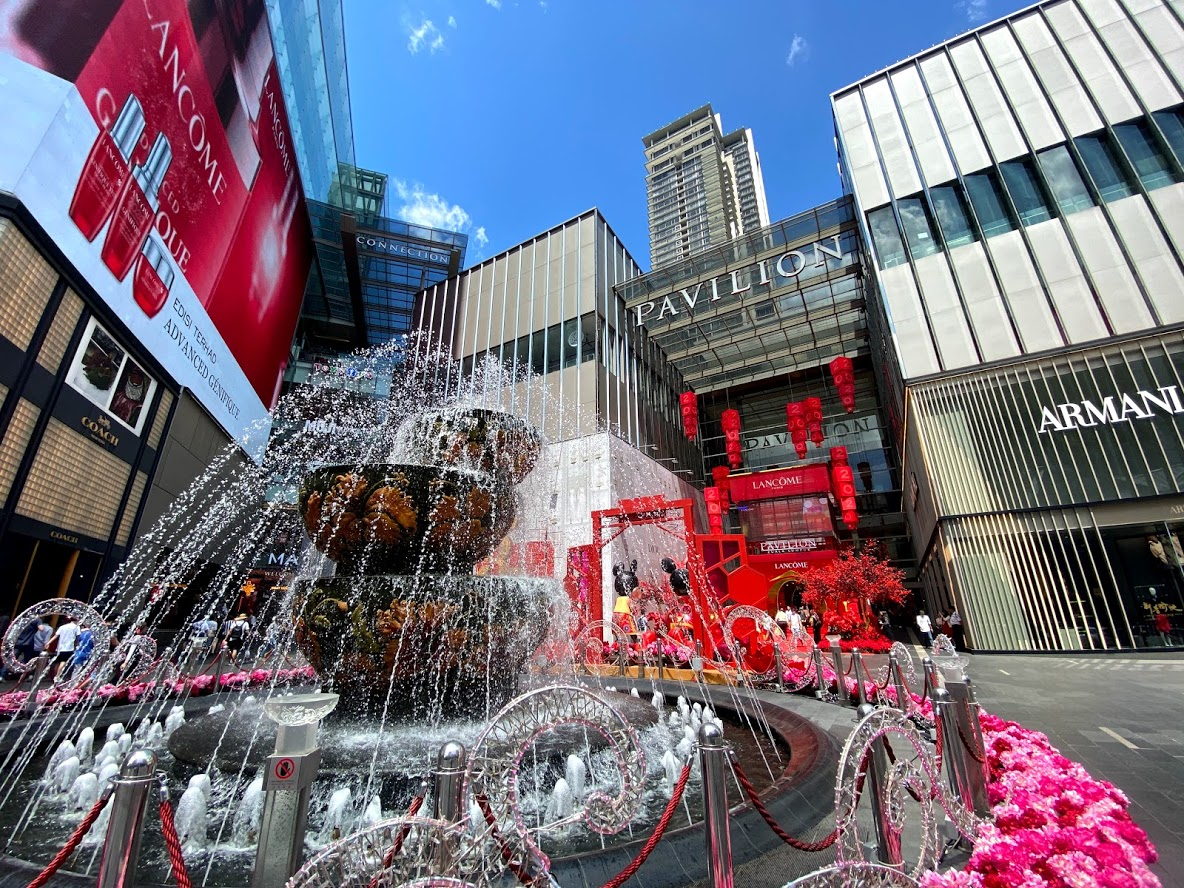
Pavilion KL

=== Bukit Bintang ===
- 118 Mall
- Berjaya Times Square
- The Exchange TRX
- Fahrenheit 88
- GMBB
- Imbi Plaza
- Lot 10
- Mitsui Shopping Park LaLaport Bukit Bintang City Centre
- Pavilion Kuala Lumpur
- Plaza Low Yat
- The Starhill (Starhill Gallery)
- Sungei Wang Plaza

=== Bukit Jalil ===
- Aurora Place Mall
- Pavilion Bukit Jalil

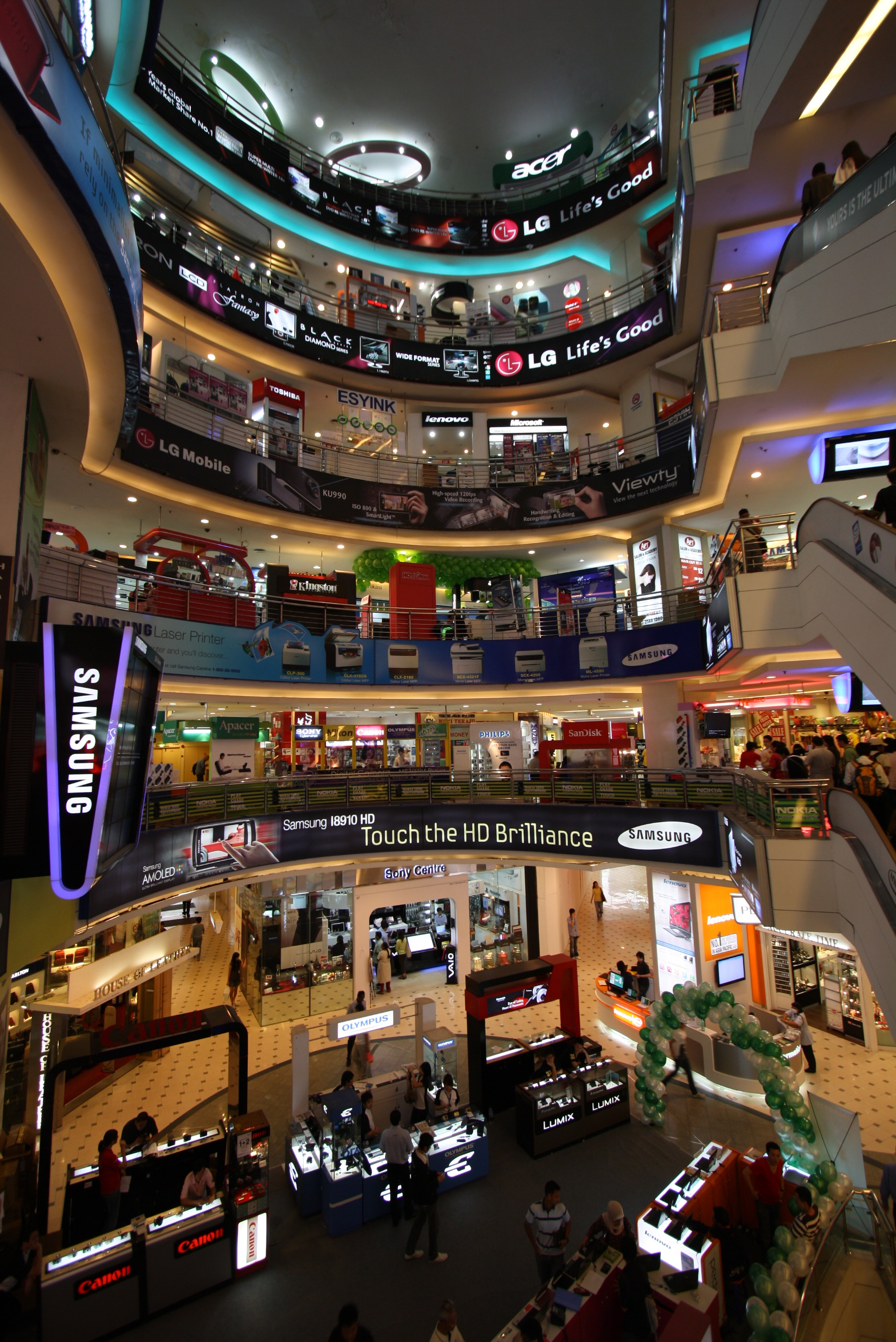
Inside Low Yat Plaza

=== Cheras ===
- 1 Shamelin Mall
- AEON Taman Maluri Shopping Centre
- Cheras Leisure Mall
- Cheras Sentral Mall
- EkoCheras Mall
- Ikon Connaught
- MyTOWN Shopping Centre
- IKEA Cheras
- Sunway Velocity Mall

=== Chow Kit ===
- City One Plaza
- Pertama Complex
- Plaza GM Kuala Lumpur
- Quill City Mall
- SOGO Kuala Lumpur
- Sunway Putra Mall

=== Kuala Lumpur City Centre ===
- 8 Conlay (suspended indefinitely)
- Avenue K Shopping Mall
- Intermark Mall
- The LINC KL
- Ombak KLCC
- Shoppes At Four Seasons Place
- Suria KLCC

=== Jalan Damansara ===
- Damansara City Mall (DC Mall)
- Pavilion Damansara Heights

=== Dang Wangi ===
- Campbell Shopping Complex
- Wilayah Complex

=== Jalan Ipoh ===
- Mutiara Complex
- Sungai Mas Plaza

=== Jalan Klang Lama ===
- Bloomsvale Shopping Gallery
- Pearl Point Shopping Mall & Pearl Shopping Gallery
- The Scott Garden

=== Kepong ===
- ÆON Mall Metro Prima
- Brem Mall
- Kompleks Desa
- Plaza Arkadia

=== KL Metropolis ===
- KL Metropolis Lifestyle Mall (coming soon)
- AEON Mall KL Midtown

=== Mid Valley City ===
- The Gardens Mall
- Mid Valley Megamall

=== Pantai Dalam ===
- INC KLEC
- KL Gateway Mall
- Nexus Bangsar South
- The Sphere

=== Pudu ===
- Pudu Plaza
- Pudu Sentral
- KWC Fashion Wholesale Mall
- Shaw Parade
- Metromall

=== Salak South ===
- Plaza Salak Park
- Bukit Kuala Lumpur Retail Park (opening in Q4 2026)

=== Segambut ===
- 1 Mont Kiara
- D'Immersione Avenue
- Hartamas Shopping Centre
- KLGCC Mall
- Plaza Mont Kiara
- Publika Shopping Gallery
- Solaris Parq The Mall
- Sunway 163 Mall
- United Point

=== Setapak ===
- KIPMall Setapak
- SAMA Square

=== Setiawangsa ===
- ÆON AU2 (Setiawangsa) Shopping Centre
- Datum Jelatek Mall

=== Sri Petaling ===
- Endah Parade
- Pinnacle Sri Petaling Mall

=== Taman Melati ===
- KL East Mall
- M3 Shopping Mall

=== Taman Melawati ===
- Melawati Mall

=== Taman Tun Dr Ismail ===
- Glo Damansara

=== Wangsa Maju ===
- ÆON Alpha Angle
- ÆON BiG Wangsa Maju
- Sunway Wangsa Mall (formerly known as Wangsa Walk Mall)
- Bazaria Wangsa Maju

== Labuan ==
- Financial Park Labuan
- Labuan Times Square
- Kompleks Ujana Kewangan

== Putrajaya ==
- Alamanda Shopping Centre

The central atrium of Alamanda Shopping Center in Putrajaya.

- IOI City Mall
- Shaftsbury Putrajaya
- Suria Mall Putrajaya
- Destina Putrajaya

== Johor ==
U Sentral Masai

Johor Bahru City Square

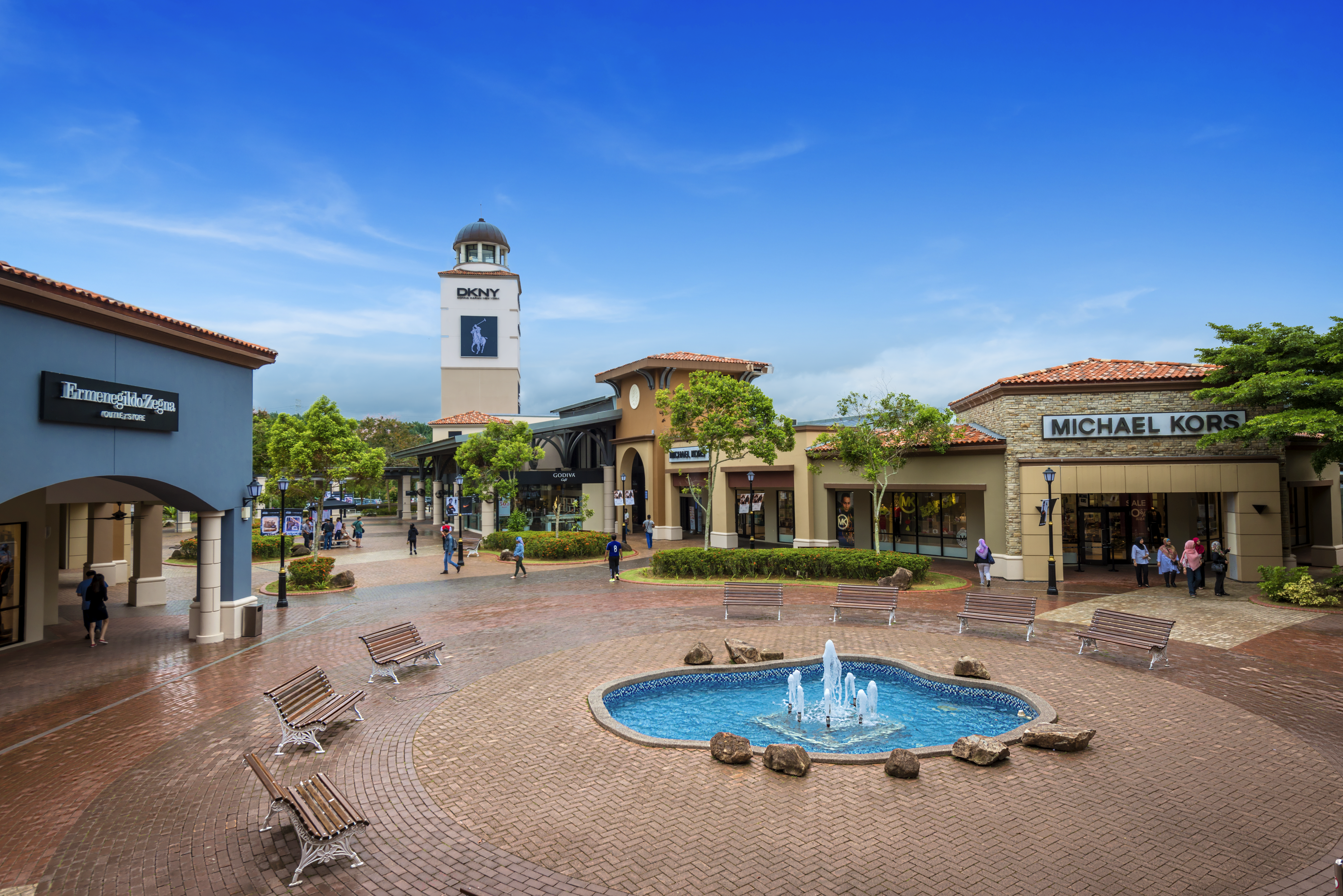
Johor Premium Outlets

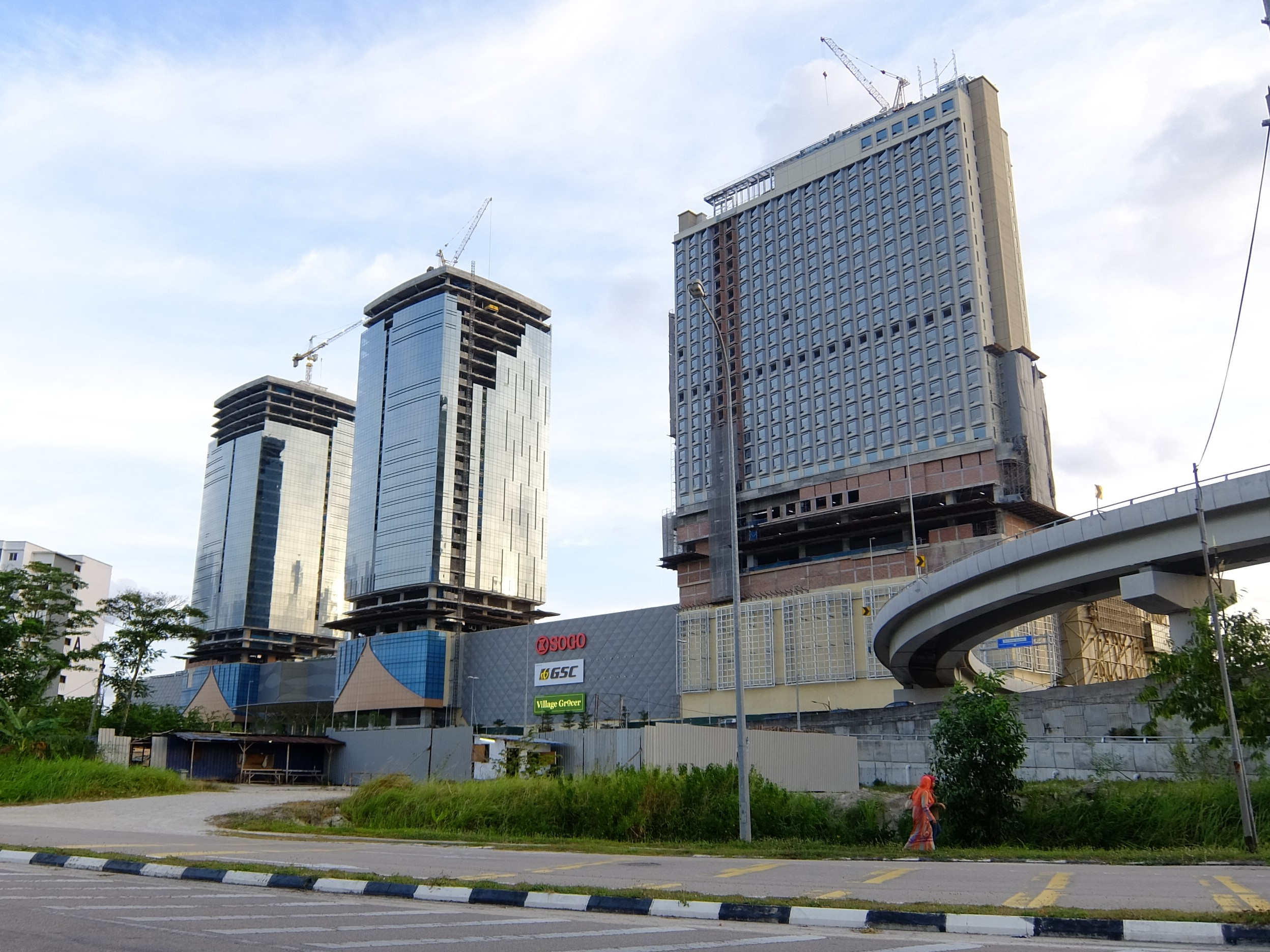
Mid Valley Southkey

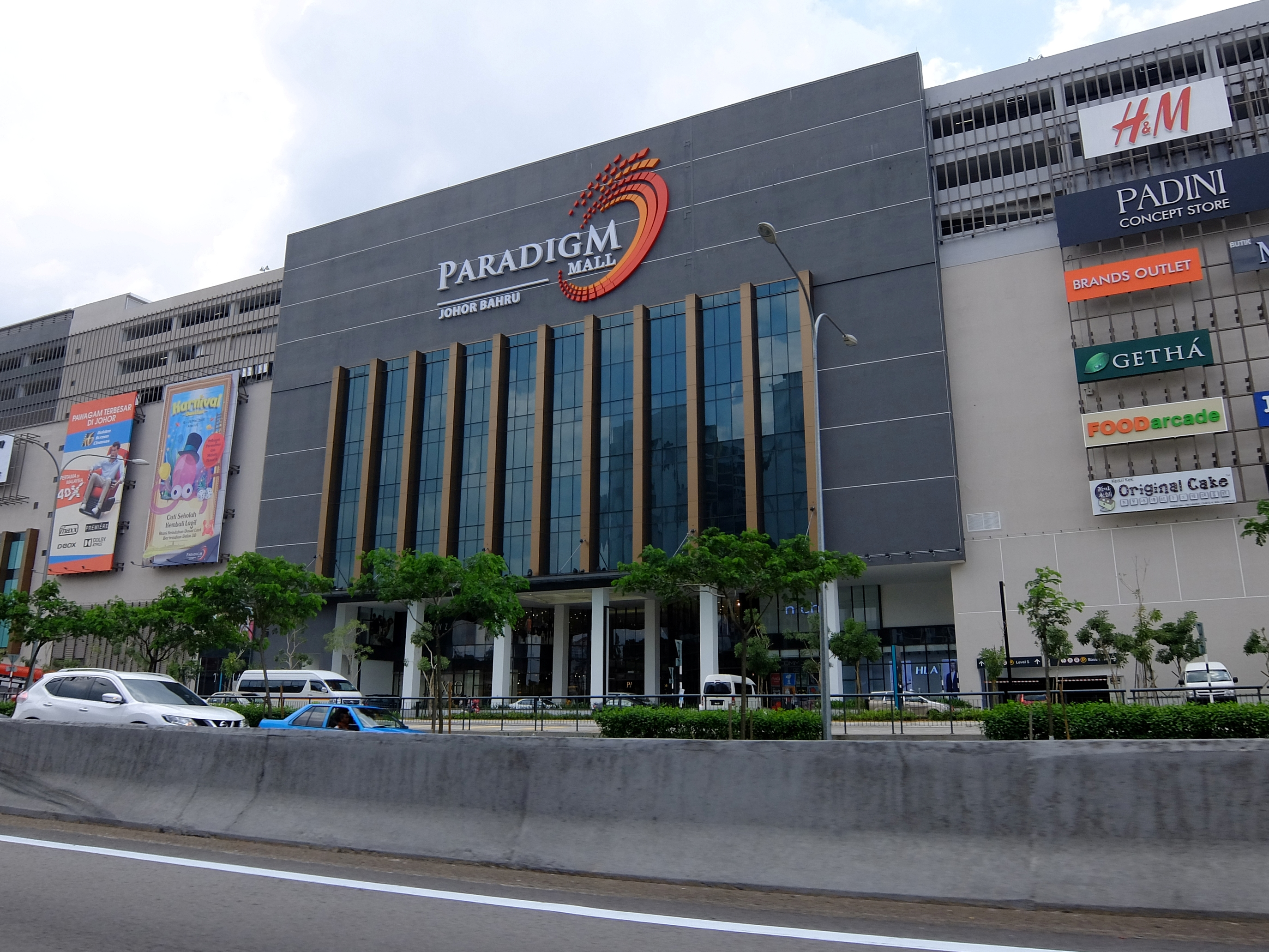
Paradigm Mall Johor Bahru

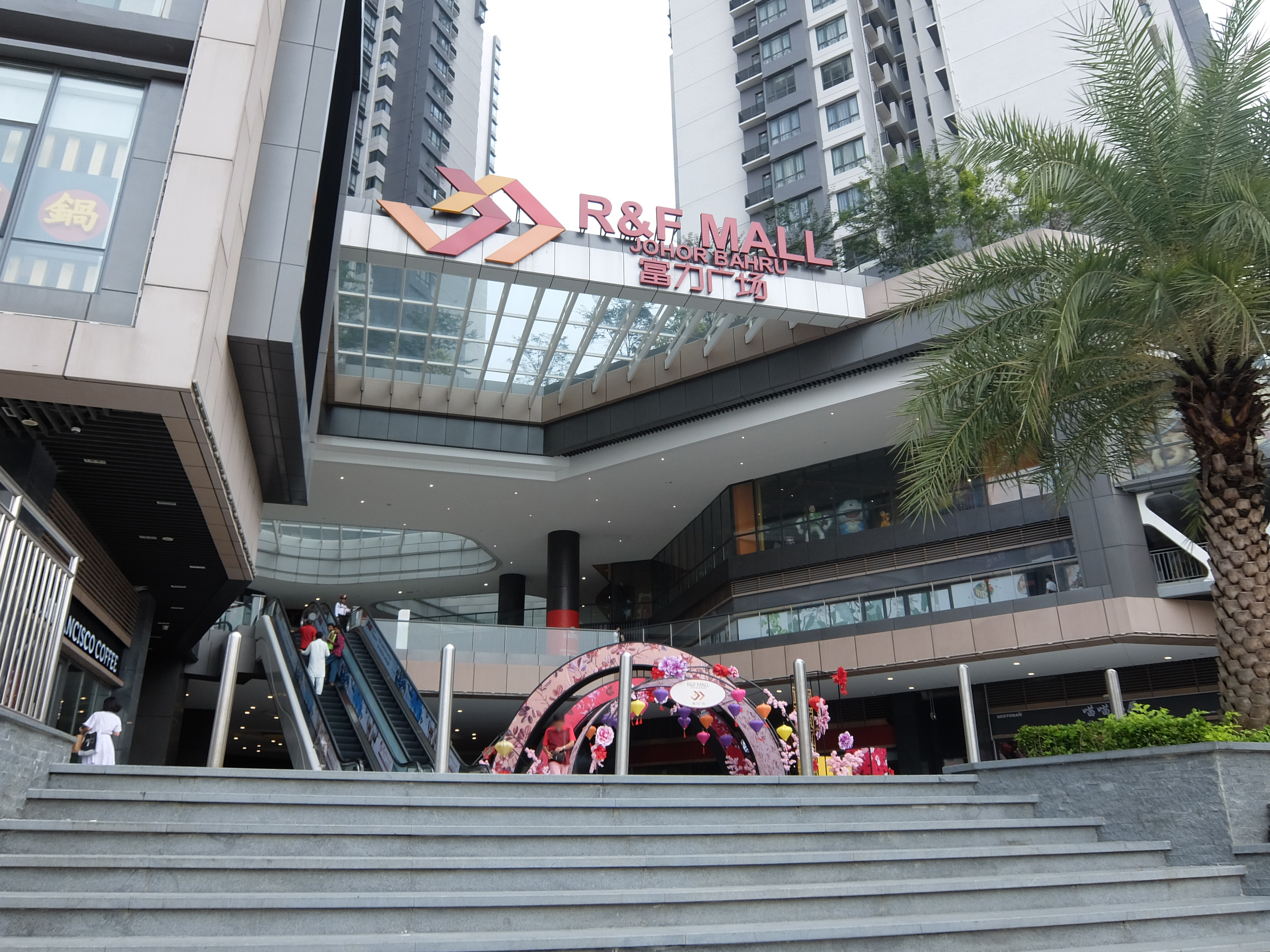
R&F Mall

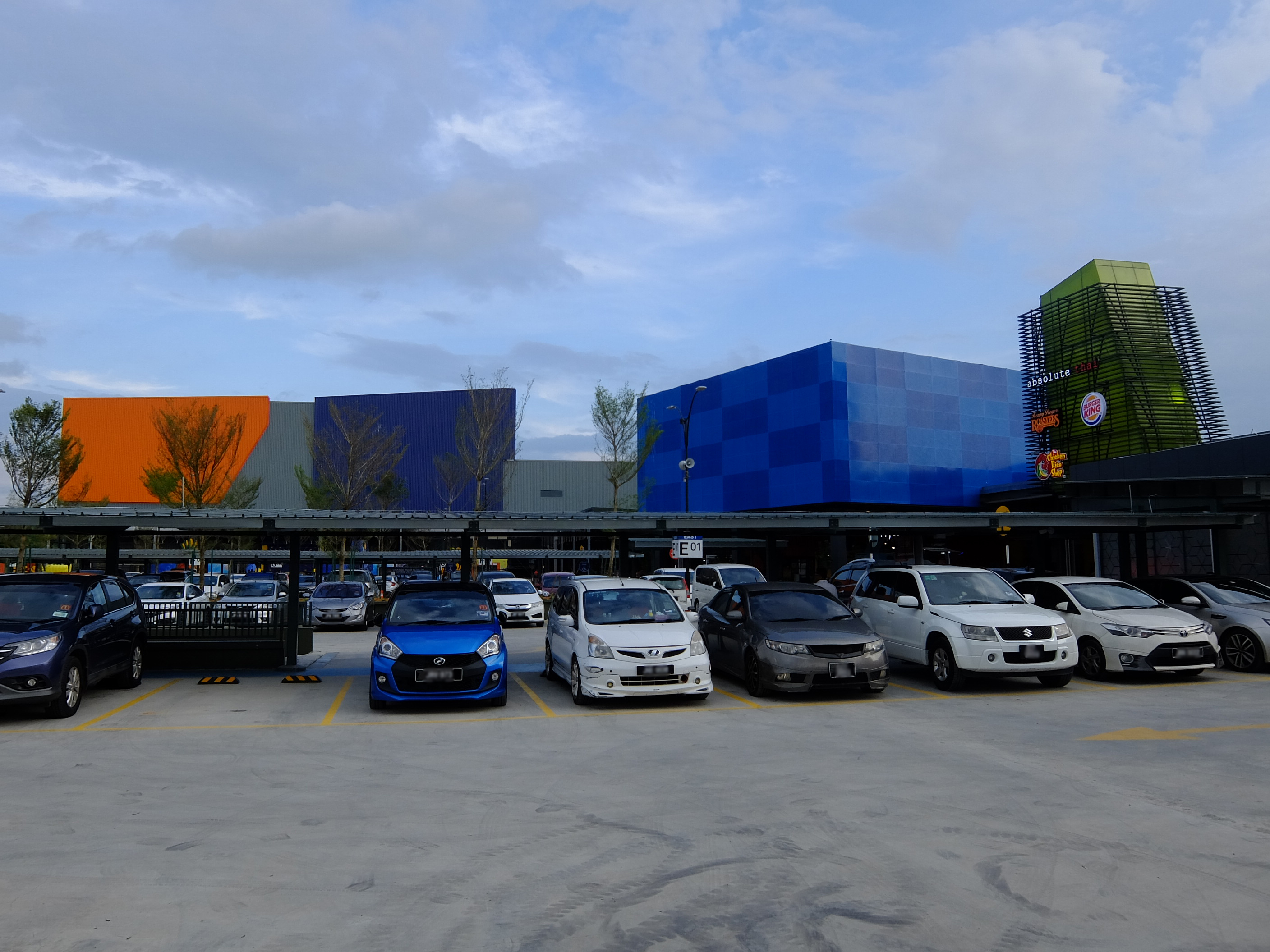
Sunway Big Box

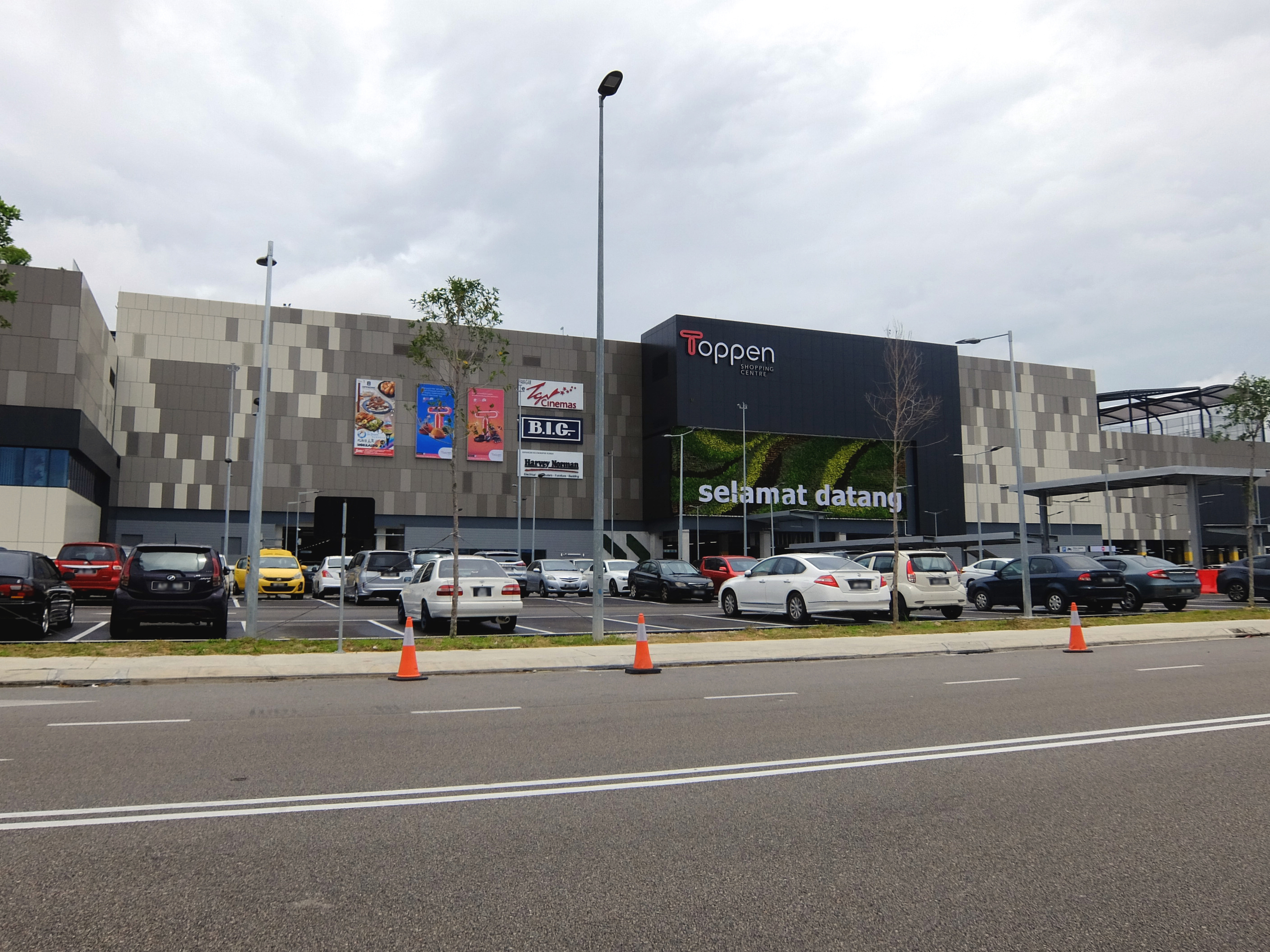
Toppen Shopping Centre

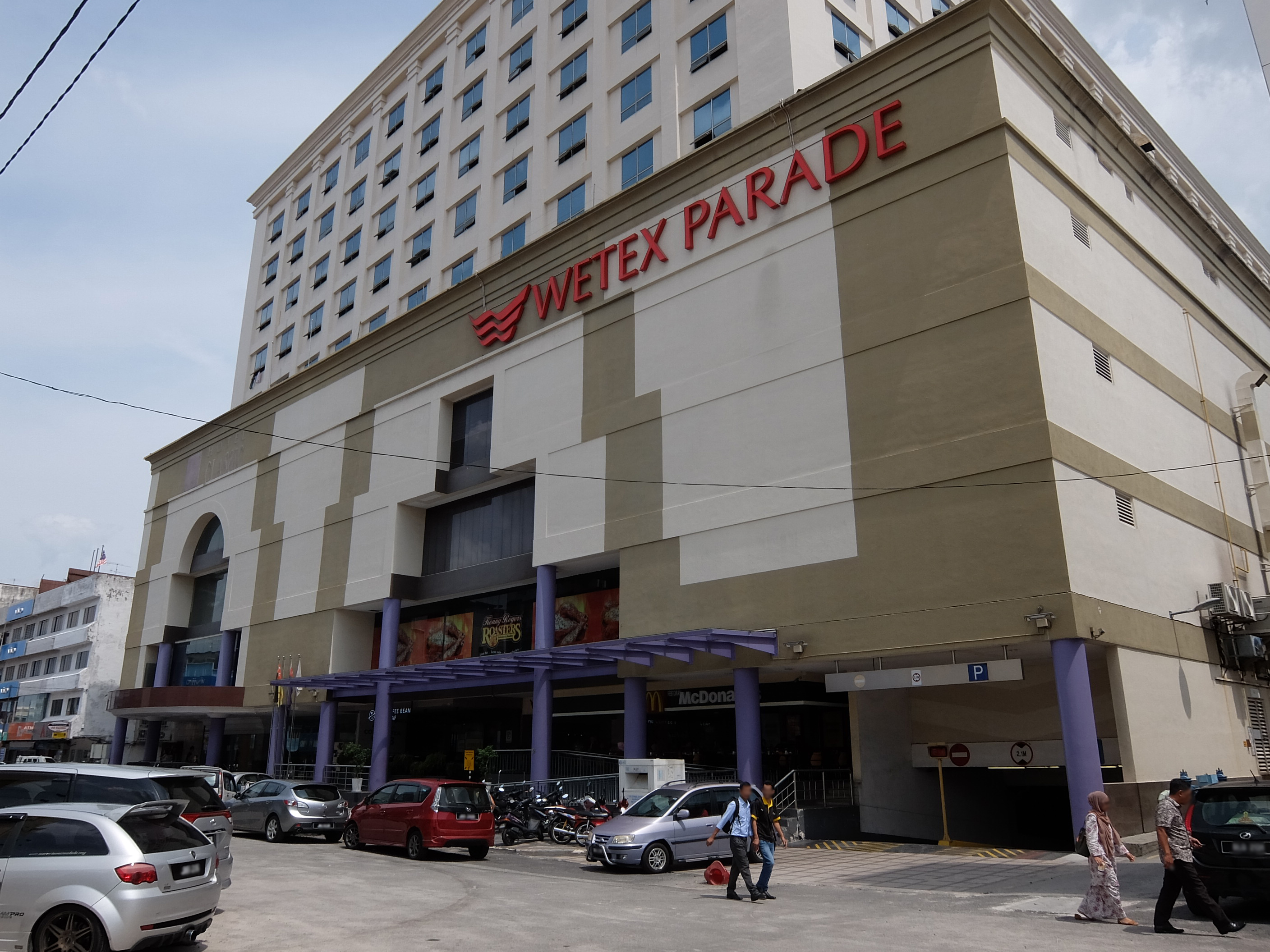
Wetex Parade

=== Batu Pahat ===
- Batu Pahat Mall
- Square One Mall
- The Summit Batu Pahat

=== Iskandar Puteri ===
- ÆON Mall Bukit Indah
- ÆON Taman Universiti Shopping Centre
- Eco Galleria
- Mall of Medini
- Perling Mall
- Sunway Big Box
- Sutera Mall
- Tasek Central
- U Mall
- Horizon Mall

=== Johor Bahru ===
- ÆON Mall Bandar Dato' Onn
- ÆON Mall Tebrau City
- ÆON Permas Jaya Shopping Centre
- Angsana Johor Bahru Mall
- Beletime Danga Bay
- Galleria@Kotaraya
- Holiday Plaza
- Johor Bahru City Square
- Komtar JBCC
- KSL City Mall
- The Mall, Mid Valley Southkey
- Larkin Junction
- Paradigm Mall Johor Bahru
- Paragon Market Place
- Pelangi Leisure Mall
- Plaza Pelangi
- Plaza Sentosa (permanently closed/demolished)
- R&F Mall (Johor Bahru)
- Toppen Shopping Centre
- Zenith Lifestyle Centre
- SKS City Mall Johor Bahru City Centre
- OBS Mall
- Santai Square
- Coronation Square Mall

=== Kluang ===
- Sunway Kluang Mall
- Kluang Parade

=== Kota Tinggi ===
- Heritage Mall
- Plaza Kota Tinggi

=== Kulai ===
- ÆON Mall Kulaijaya
- IOI Mall Kulai
- Johor Premium Outlets
- Kulai Centre Point
- The Commune Kulai

=== Muar ===
- Astaka Shopping Centre
- Wetex Parade

=== Pasir Gudang ===
- Kompleks Pusat Bandar Pasir Gudang
- Today's Market
- U Sentral Masai

=== Pengerang ===
- SKS City Mall

=== Pontian District ===
- Plaza Pontian (formerly Billion Plaza Pontian)

=== Segamat ===
- Segamat Central
- U Sentral Shopping Centre

== Kedah ==
=== Alor Setar ===
- Alor Setar Mall
- Aman Central
- City Plaza
- Sentosa Plaza
- Star Parade

=== Kubang Pasu ===
- Jitra Mall

=== Kulim ===
- Kulim Landmark Central

=== Langkawi ===
- Cenang Mall
- Langkawi Fair Shopping Mall
- Langkawi Parade MegaMall
- Jetty Point Complex
- Langkawi Saga Shopping Centre

=== Sungai Petani ===
- Amanjaya Mall
- Central Square
- Petani Parade
- SP Plaza
- Village Mall

== Kelantan ==
=== Gua Musang ===
- G-Orange Mall Gua Musang

=== Kota Bharu ===
- Mydin Mall Tunjong
- Mydin Mall Kubang Kerian
- ÆON Mall Kota Bharu
- G-Orange Mall Tunjong
- KB Mall
- Kota Bharu Trade Centre (temporarily closed)
- Kota Seri Mutiara Shopping Centre

== Melaka ==
=== Alor Gajah ===
- Freeport A'Famosa Outlet

=== Jasin ===
- Jasin Point
- Mydin Mall Jasin

=== Malacca City ===
- ÆON Mall Melaka
- ÆON Mall Ayer Keroh
- Mydin MITC Melaka
- Dataran Pahlawan Melaka Megamall
- ElementX Mall
- Mahkota Parade
- Melaka Mall
- The Shore Shopping Gallery
- Hatten Square
- Plaza Hang Tuah

== Negeri Sembilan ==
=== Jempol ===
- Kiara Square, Bahau

=== Nilai ===
- ÆON Mall Nilai
- MesaMall Nilai

=== Port Dickson ===
- Econsave Port Dickson
- Lotus's Lukut
- TF Value-Mart Port Dickson
- Econsave Lukut
- Polymall
- PD Sunggala Gateaway
- Regina Mall

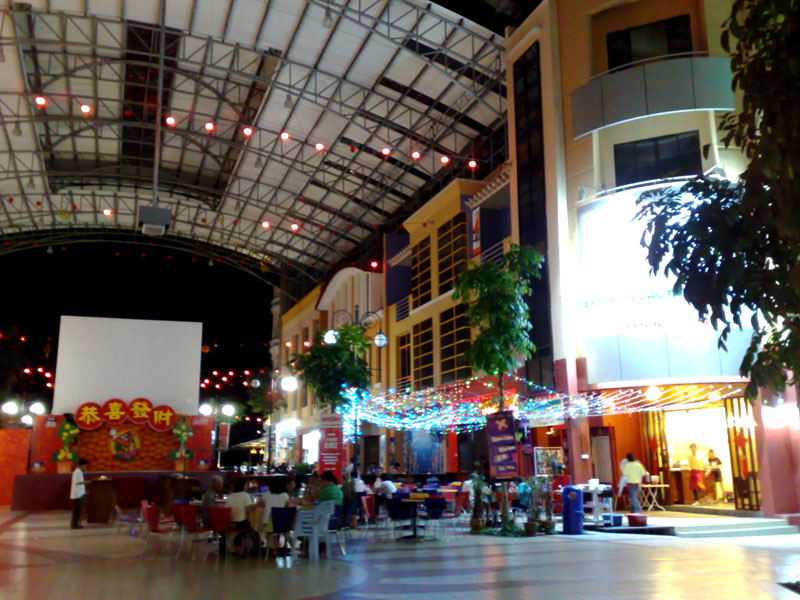
Central stage area in Era Square

=== Seremban ===
- ÆON Seremban 2 Shopping Centre
- Angsana Seremban Mall, Ampangan
- Centrepoint Seremban Shopping Mall
- Era Square
- KM Plaza
- Palm Mall
- Seremban Gateway
- Seremban Prima

== Pahang ==
=== Cameron Highlands ===
- Cameron Centrum, Brinchang
- Cameron Fair Shopping Centre, Tanah Rata
- Cameron Square, Brinchang

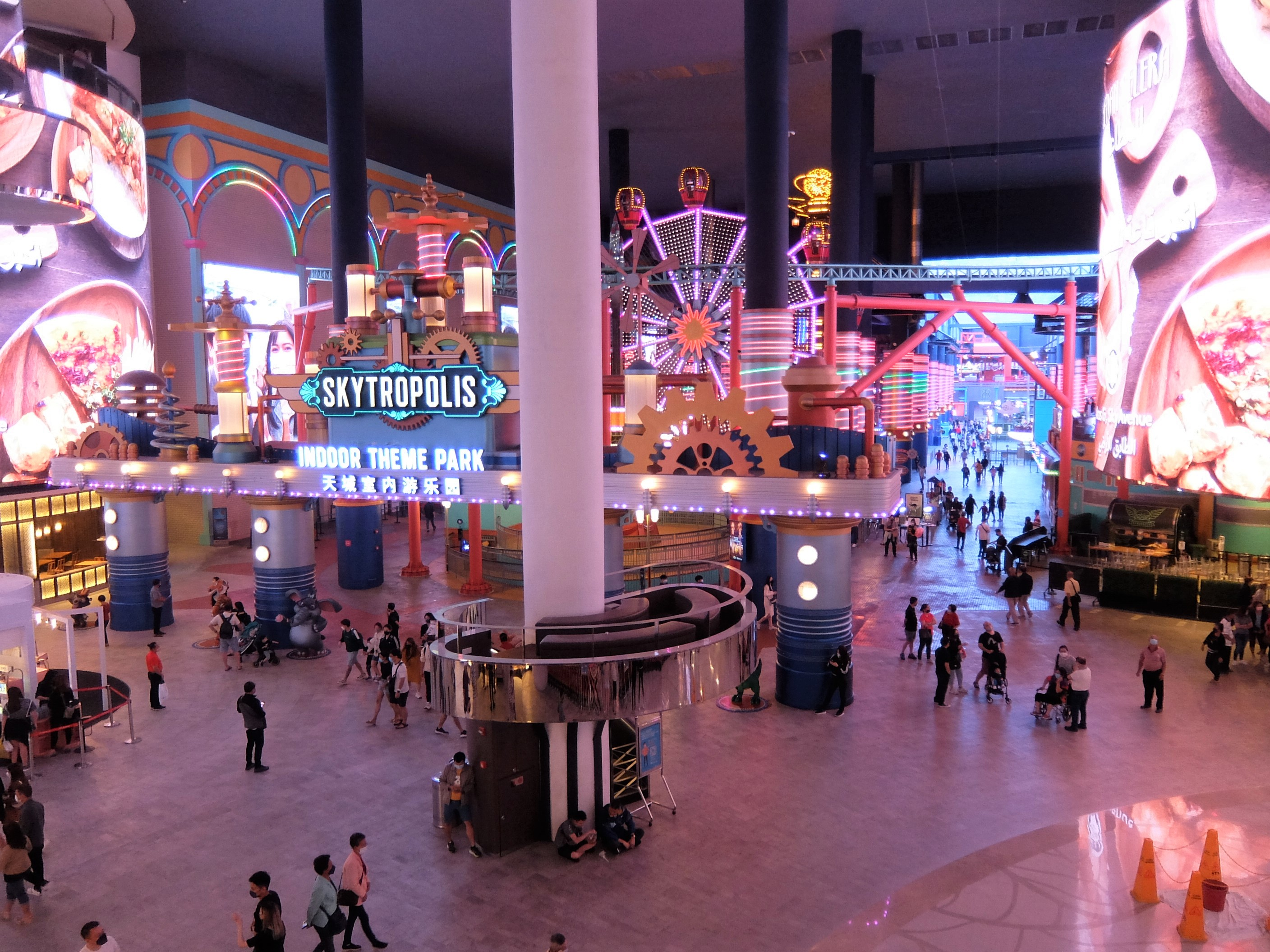
Skytropolis Indoor Theme Park in First World Plaza

=== Genting Highlands ===
- Antara Signature Mall
- Awana SkyCentral
- First World Plaza
- Genting Highlands Premium Outlet
- Pavilion Genting Highlands (opening soon)
- SkyAvenue

=== Kuantan ===
- Berjaya Megamall
- East Coast Mall
- Gio Mall
- Kuantan City Mall
- Kuantan Parade
- Teruntum Complex

=== Temerloh ===
- Temerloh Mall
- TMG Temerloh

=== Mentakab ===
- Mentakab Star Mall

== Penang ==
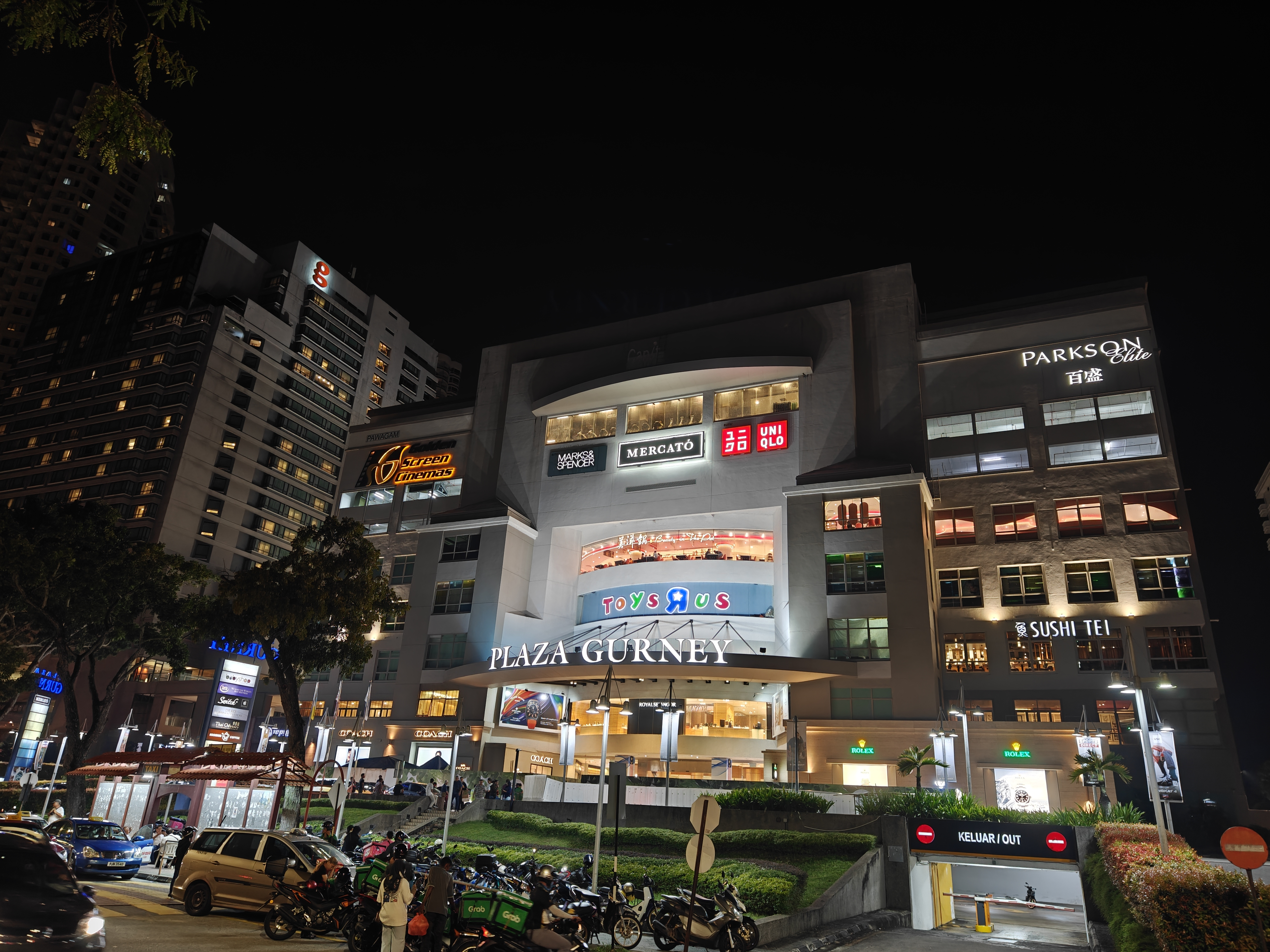
Gurney Plaza

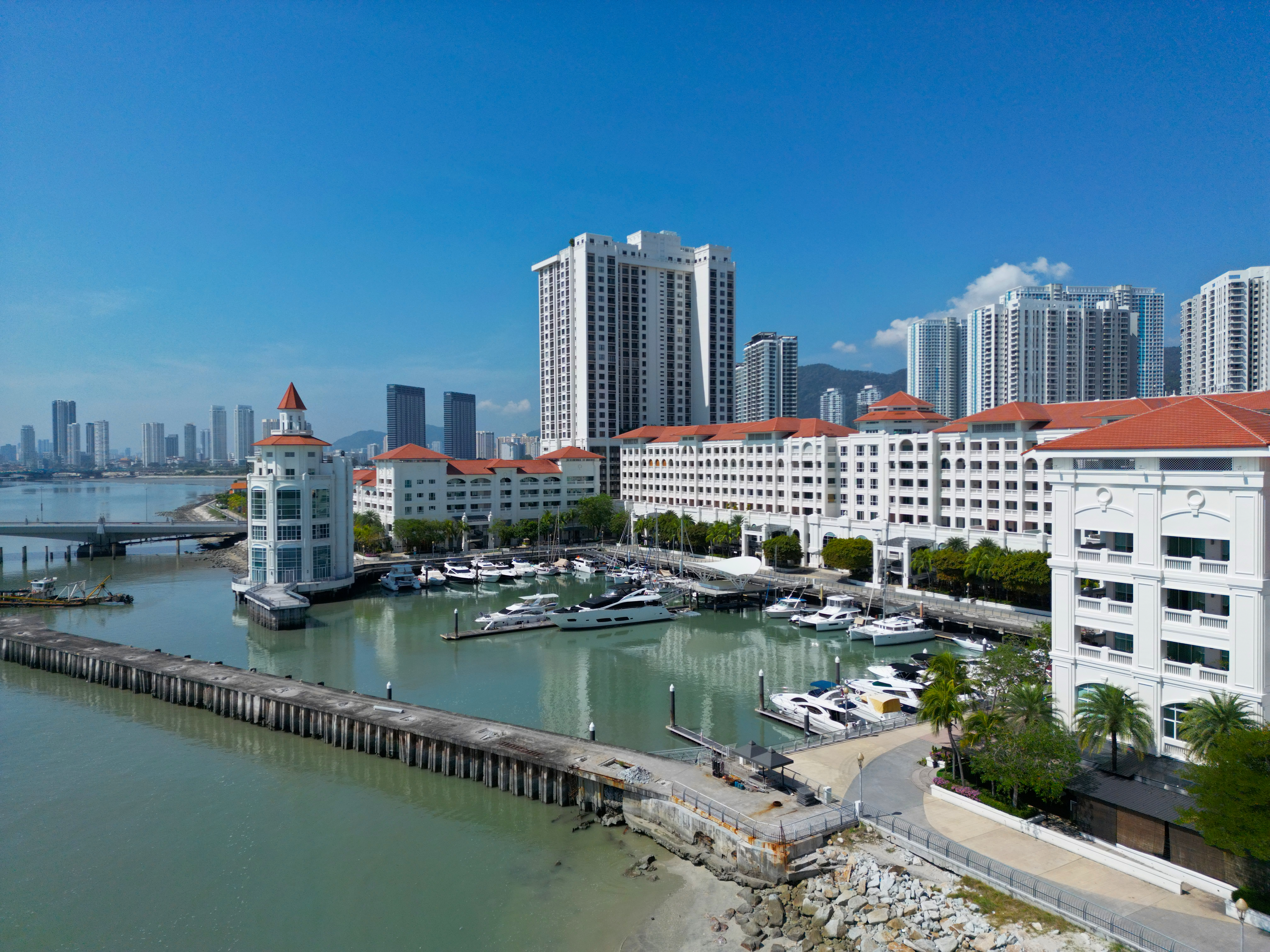
Straits Quay

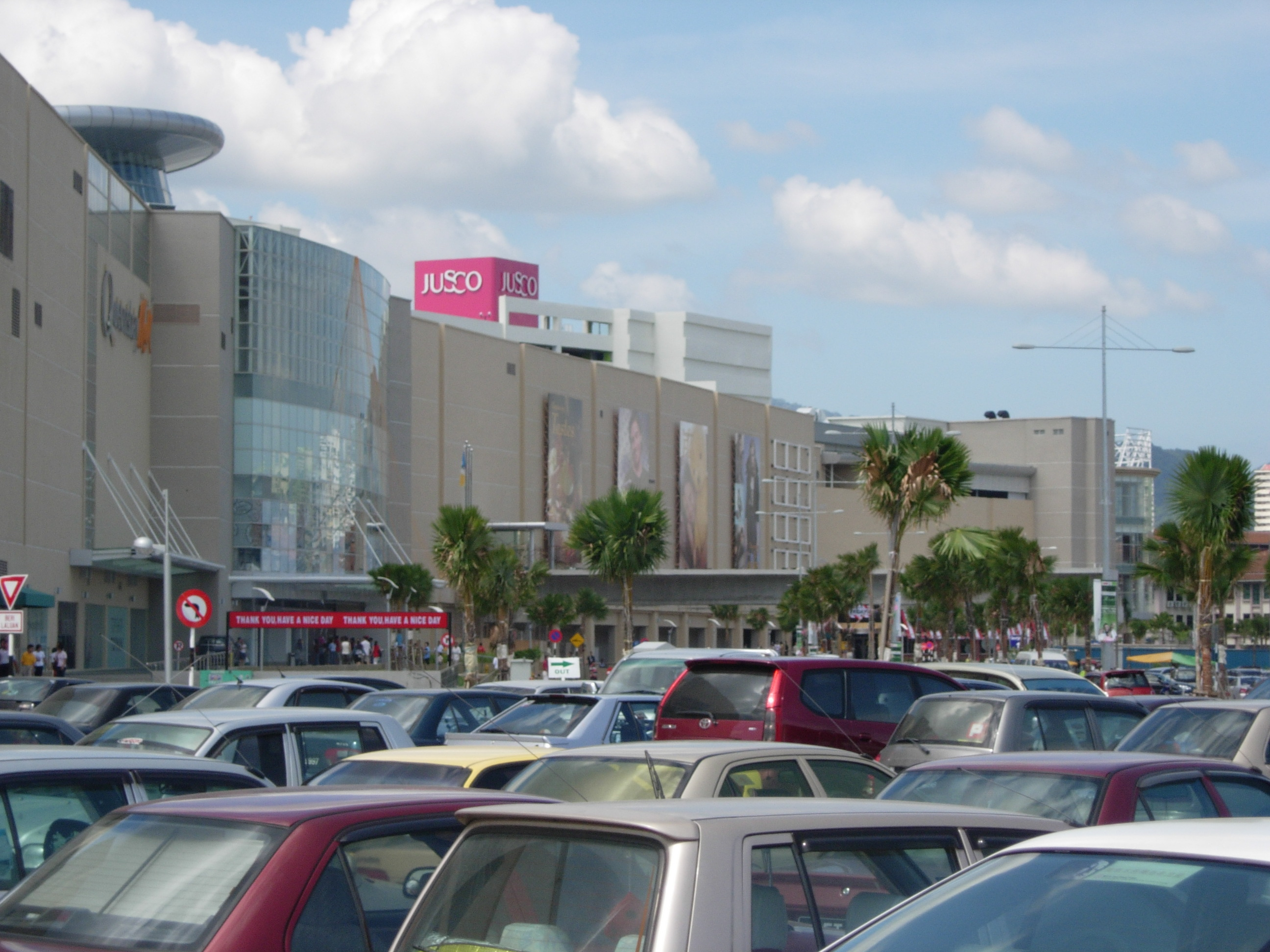
Queensbay Mall

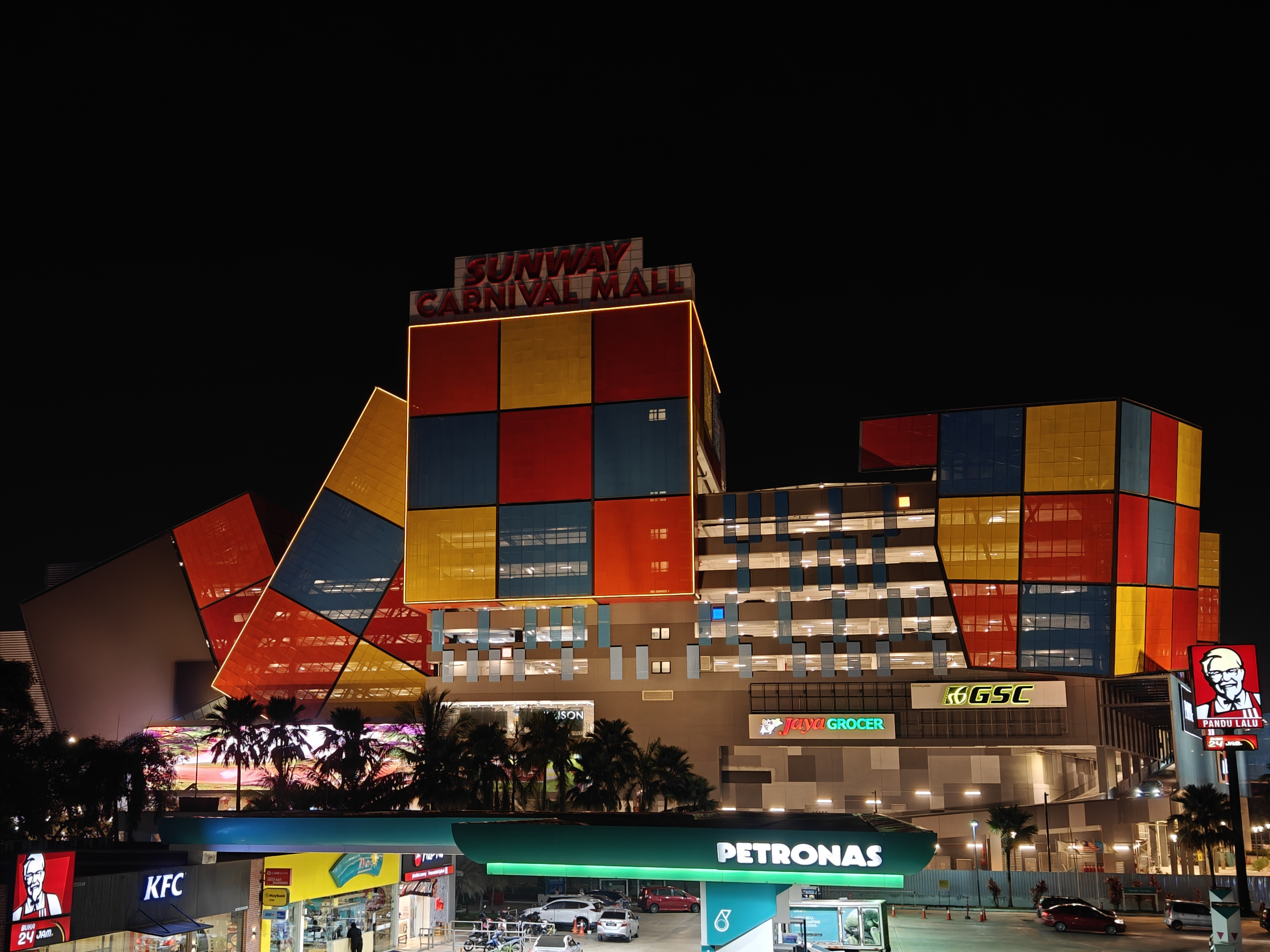
Sunway Carnival Mall

=== Northeast District (Island) ===
- KOMTAR
- Prangin Mall
- 1st Avenue
- Gurney Walk
- Gurney Plaza
- Gurney Paragon
- The Waterfront Shoppes of The Light City
- Sunshine Central
- Udini Square
- Times Square
- Straits Quay Marina Mall

=== Southwest District (Island) ===
- Queensbay Mall
- Queens Waterfront
- Southbay Plaza
- Sunshine Square
- Kompleks Bukit Jambul

=== North Seberang Perai District (Mainland) ===
- Penang Sentral
- Sunshine Kepala Batas

=== Central Seberang Perai (Mainland) ===
- Sunway Carnival Mall
- AEON Bukit Mertajam
- Megamall Pinang

=== South Seberang Perai District (Mainland) ===
- Design Village Mall
- IKEA Batu Kawan
- Pearl City Mall
- Klippa Batu Kawan

== Perak ==
=== Bidor ===
- Bidor Sentral

=== Ipoh ===
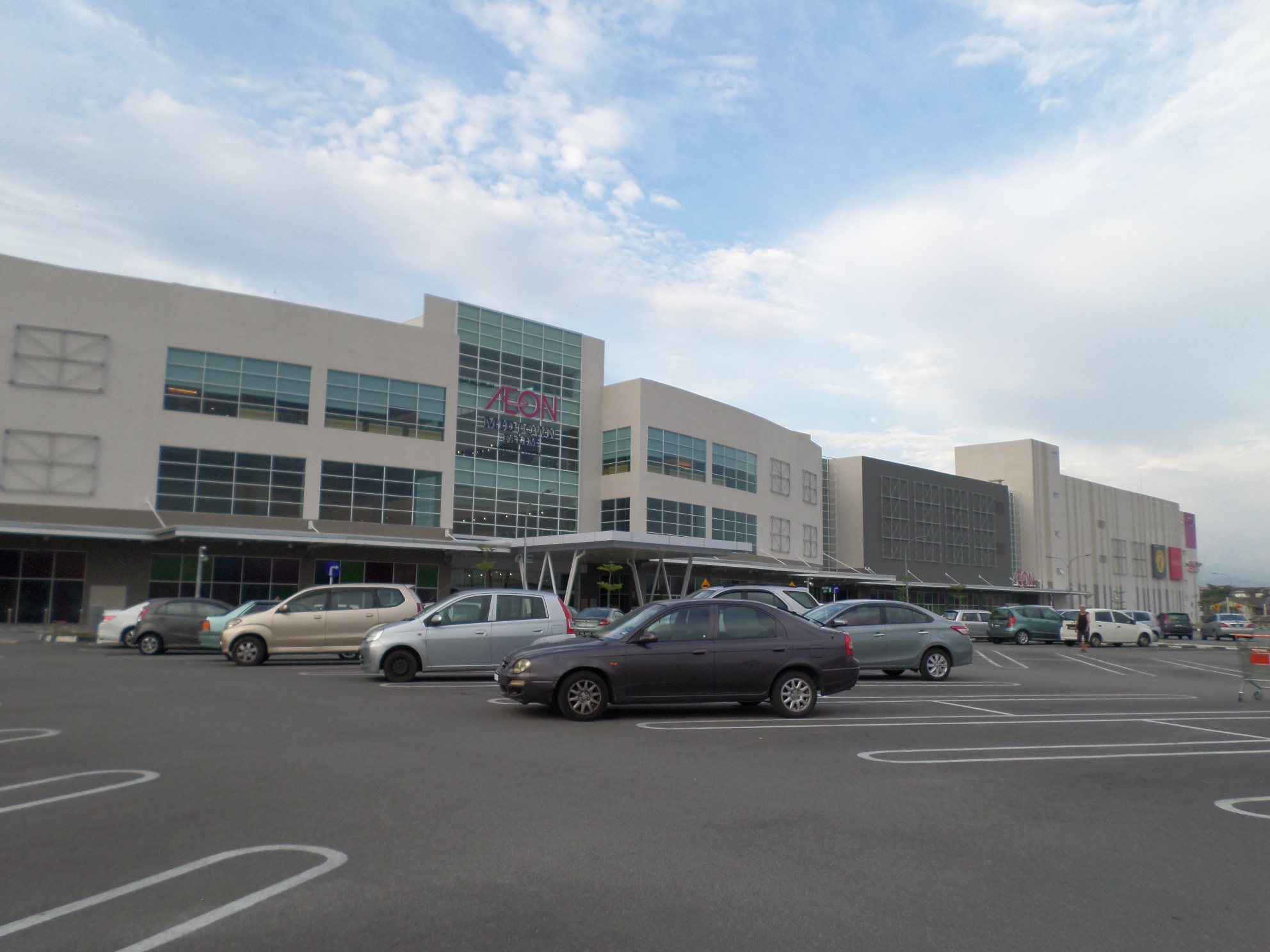
AEON Midtown Falim at Falim IPOH

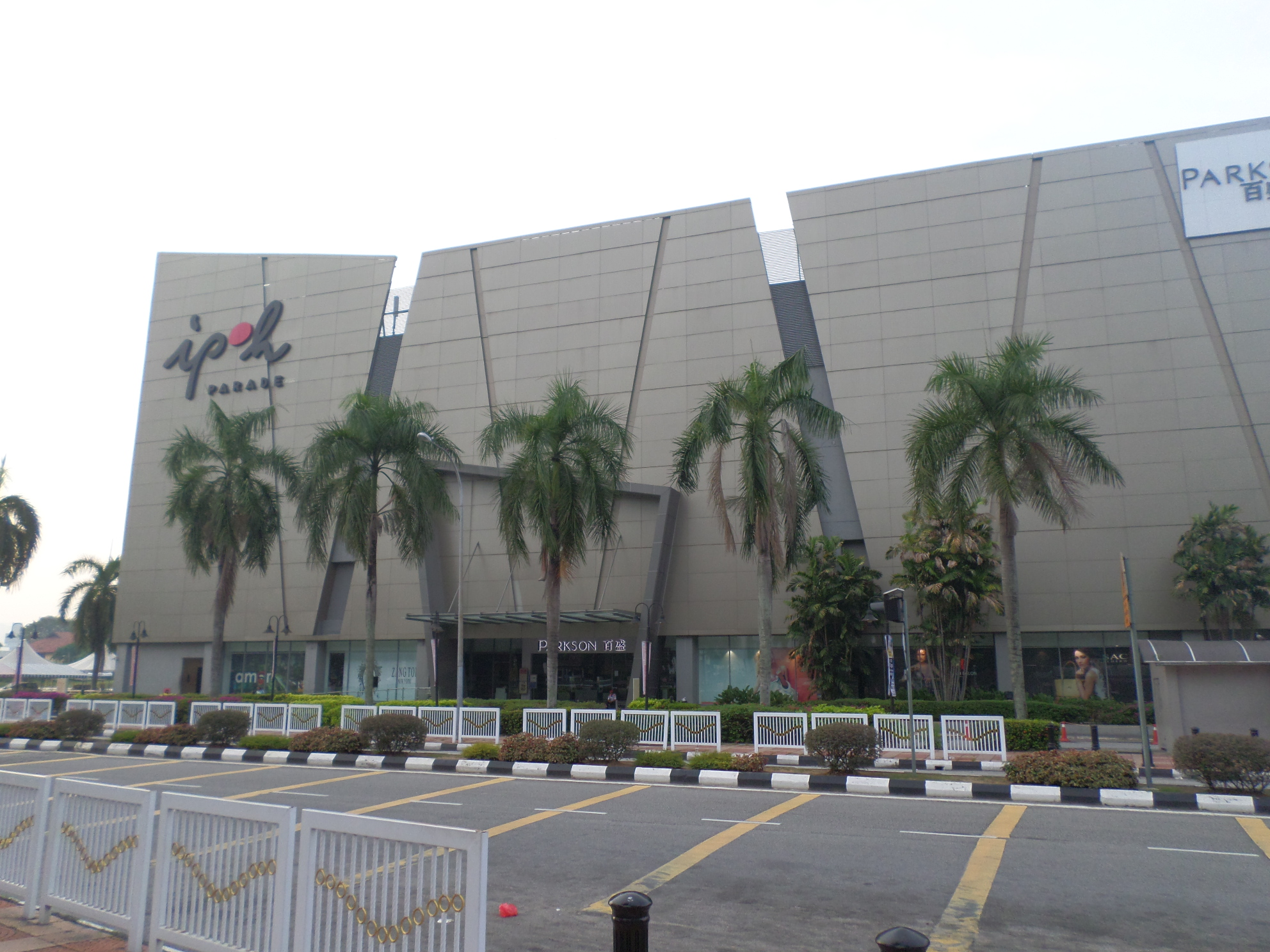
IPOH Parade Mall at Jalan Sultan Abdul Jalil, Ipoh

- ÆON Mall Ipoh Station 18
- ÆON Mall Kinta City
- Sentra Mall Ipoh (Formerly ÆON Mall Klebang)
- ÆON Midtown Falim
- Angsana Ipoh Mall
- IPOH Parade
- Kompleks Yik Foong
- Perak IT Mall
- Sunway Ipoh Mall (opening in 2027)

=== Kampar ===
- Kampar Terminal Mall
- Tin Village Mall

=== Kerian ===
- Kerian Sentral Mall, Parit Buntar

=== Manjung ===
- ÆON Mall Seri Manjung

=== Perak Tengah ===
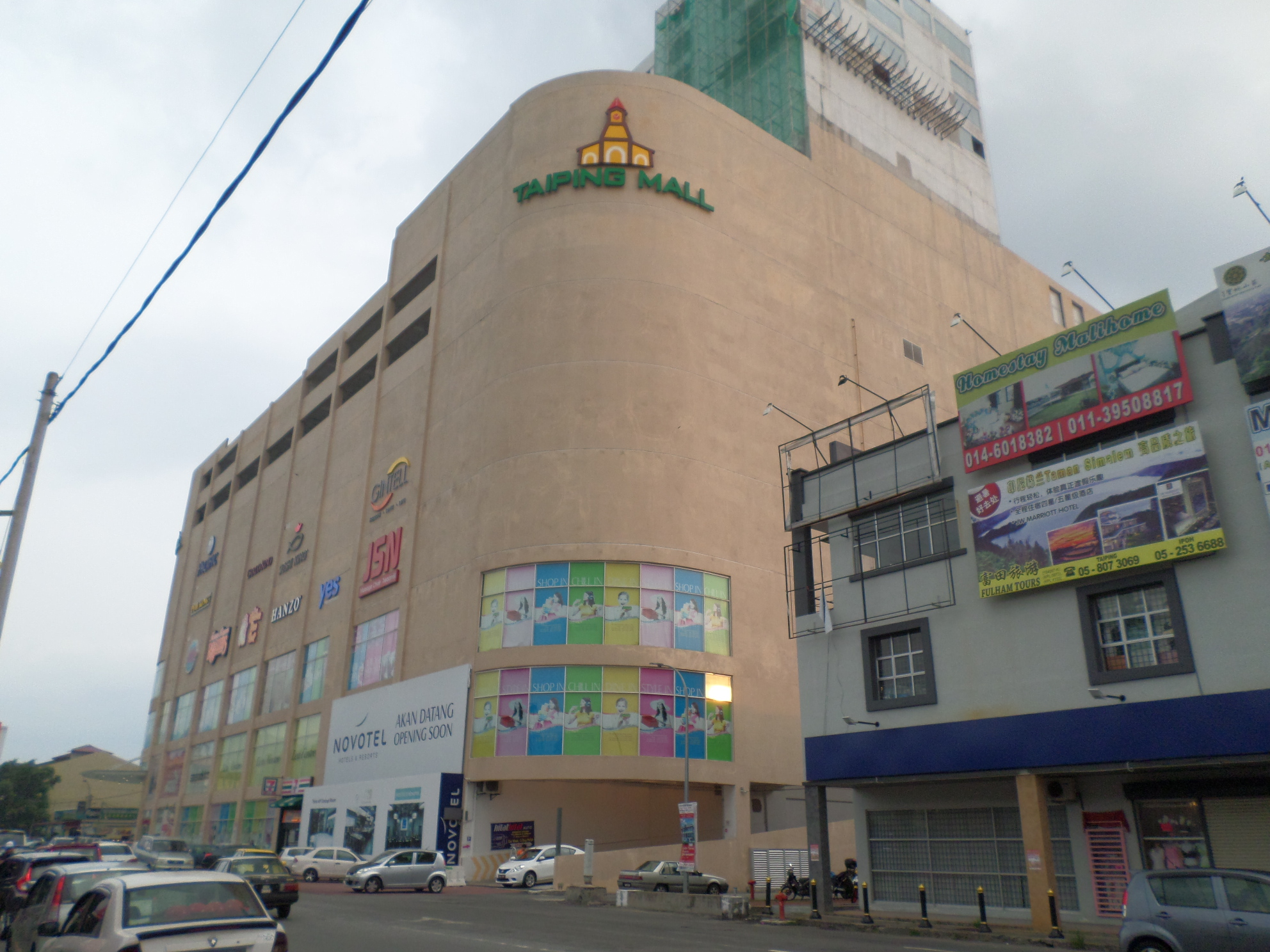
Taiping Mall is set in the bustling heart of Taiping town. This 9-storey modern multi-tiered mall has over 400,000 sq. ft. of retail space and amenities.

- D'Mall, Seri Iskandar

=== Taiping ===
- ÆON Mall Taiping
- Taiping Mall
- Taiping Sentral Mall

== Perlis ==
=== Arau ===
- Kompleks Arau

=== Kangar ===
- Kangar Jaya Mall

=== Padang Besar ===
- Padang Besar Street

== Sabah ==
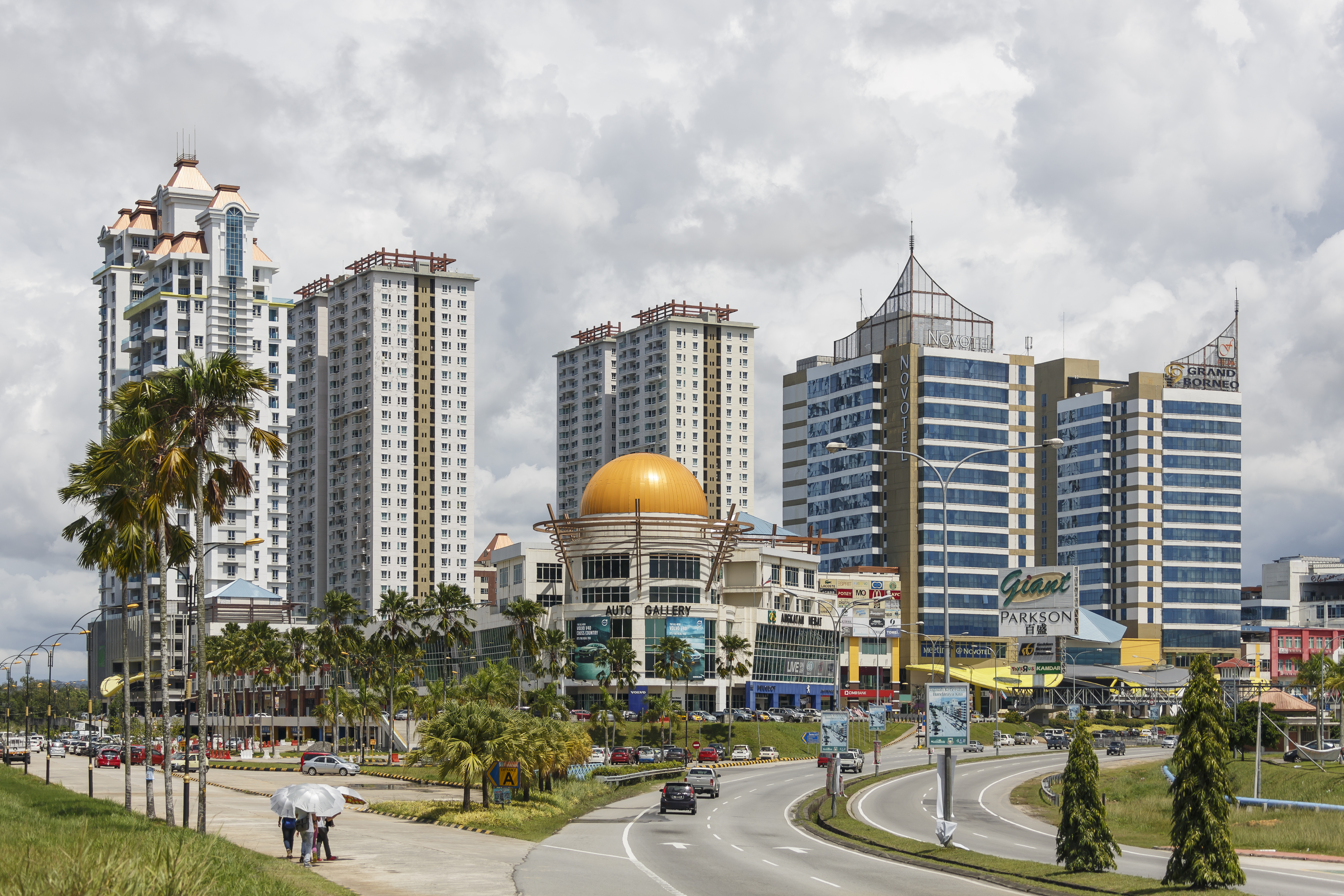
1Borneo Hypermall in Kota Kinabalu, also the largest mall in Borneo

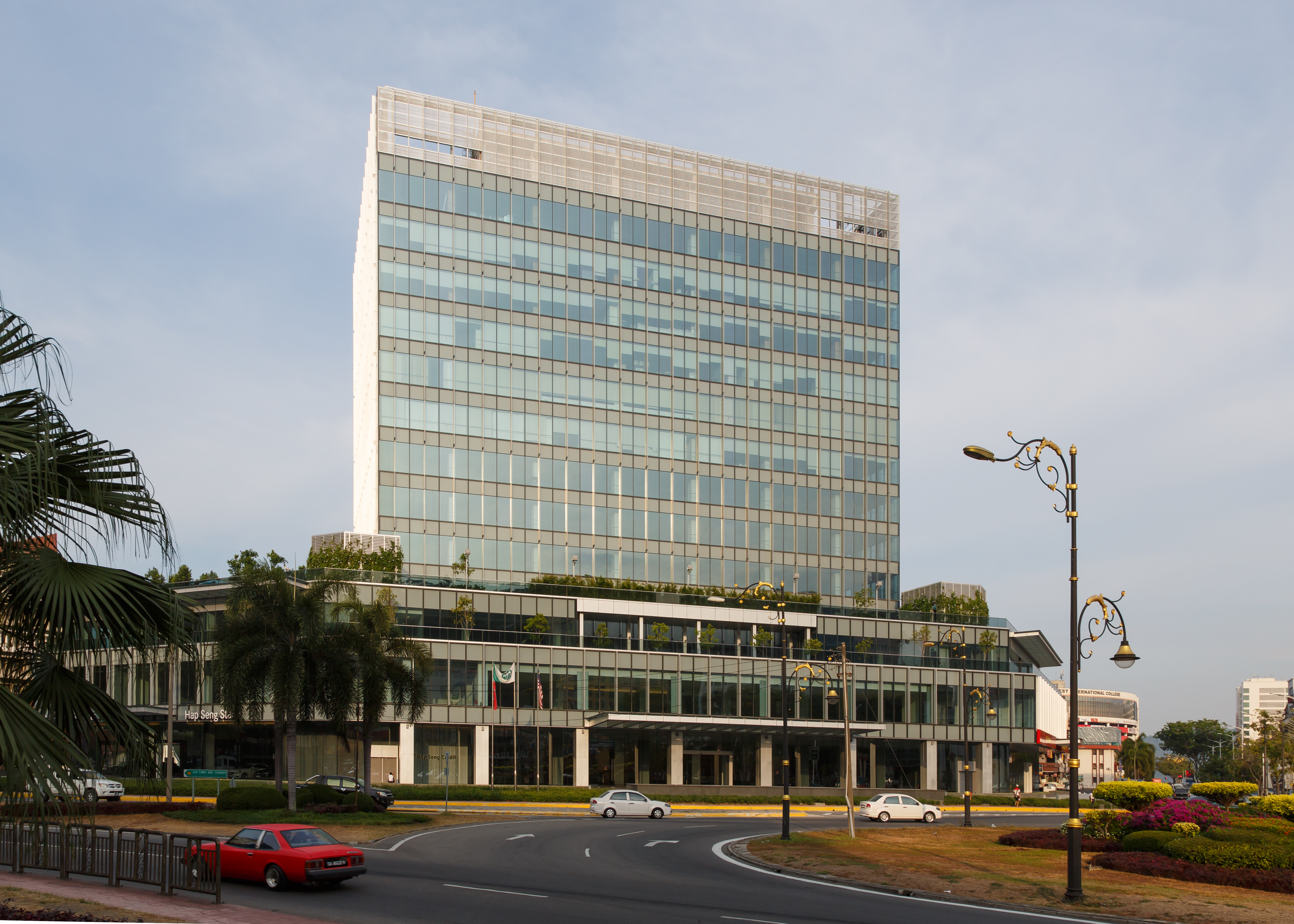
Plaza Shell, also part of shopping malls in Sabah

=== Keningau ===
- Keningau Mall

=== Beaufort ===
- Beaufort City Mall

=== Kota Kinabalu ===
- 1Borneo Hypermall
- 88 Mall
- Centre Point Sabah
- City Mall
- EG Mall Inanam
- Grand Merdeka
- Imago KK Times Square
- Inanam Mall
- ITCC Penampang
- Jesselton Residences (Jesselton Duty Free Mall)
- Karamunsing Complex
- KK Plaza
- Mega Long Mall
- Oceanus Waterfront Mall
- Plaza Shell
- Riverson The Walk
- Suria Sabah
- Sutera Avenue
- Wisma Merdeka

=== Sandakan ===
- Harbour Mall Sandakan

=== Tawau ===
- Eastern Plaza
- Grace Plaza
- Pasar Tanjung Tawau
- Servay Hypermarket Tawau
- SABINDO PLAZA
- Garden City

== Sarawak ==
=== Bintulu ===
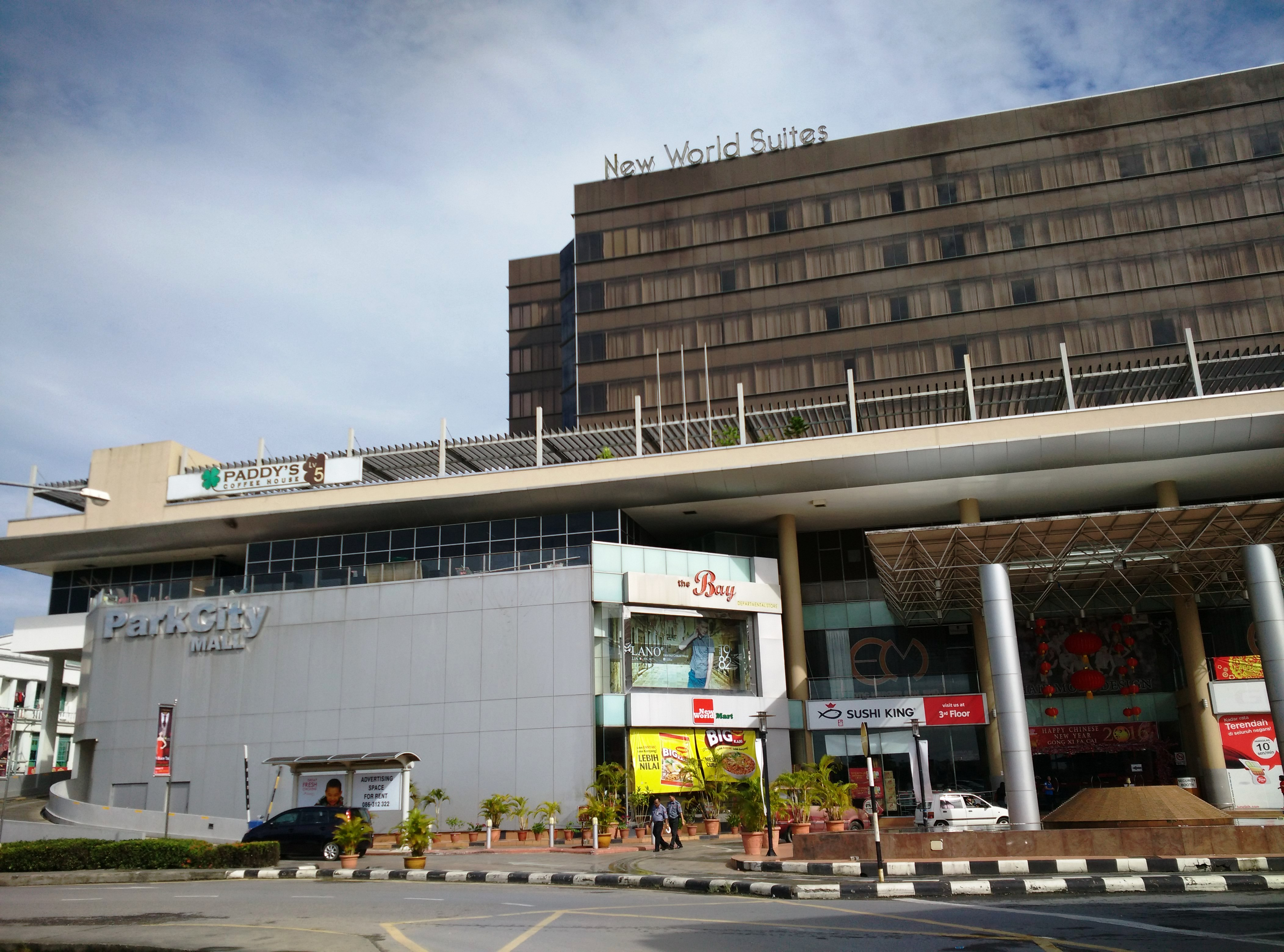
Parkcity Mall at Bintulu

- Boulevard Shopping Mall Bintulu
- City Point Mall
- Li Hua Plaza
- Medan Mall
- Naim Street Mall
- Parkcity Commerce Square Mall
- Parkcity Mall
- SK One Garden City
- The Spring Bintulu
- Times Square Mega Mall

=== Kota Samarahan ===
- Aiman Mall (@iman Mall)
- Arden City Kota Samarahan
- La Promenade Mall
- NorthBank Central, Samarahan (via Tabuan Tranquility Kuching)
- Summer Mall

=== Kuching ===
- ÆON Mall Kuching Central
- Aeroville Mall
- Boulevard Shopping Mall (3rd Mile, Kuching)
- CityONE Megamall
- Crown Square Kuching
- Electra House
- FARLEY Mall (6th Mile, Kota Sentosa, Kuching)
- Genesis Parade
- Green Heights Mall
- The Hills Kuching
- Kuching Sentral
- Majma Mall
- Matang Mall
- One TJ ICT Shopping Complex
- OneJaya Lifestyle Mall
- Pines Mall (Pines Square Parade), Batu Kawah
- Batu Kawah Megamall, Batu Kawah (currently in final proposal stage, full-scale construction is set to begin in early 2027.)
- Plaza Merdeka Shopping Centre, Kuching
- Riverside Shopping Complex
- Sarawak Plaza, Kuching
- The Spring Shopping Mall
- ST3 Shopping Mall
- Tabuan Plaza
- Tun Jugah Mall Kuching
- Vivacity Megamall Kuching
- Westfield Point (6th Mile, Kota Sentosa, Kuching)
- Wisma Hopoh
- Wisma Saberkas
- Wisma Satok
- Wisma Wan Shopping Centre, Kuching

=== Lawas ===
- LePapa Hypermall Lawas

=== Limbang ===
- Limbang Plaza

=== Miri ===
- Bintang Megamall
- Boulevard Shopping Mall Miri
- Imperial Mall
- Miri Plaza
- Miri Times Square
- MYY Mall
- Pelita Tunku
- Permaisuri Imperial City Mall
- Permy Mall
- Soon Hup Tower

=== Mukah ===
- Medan Mall

=== Serian ===
- Eastern Mall

=== Sibu ===
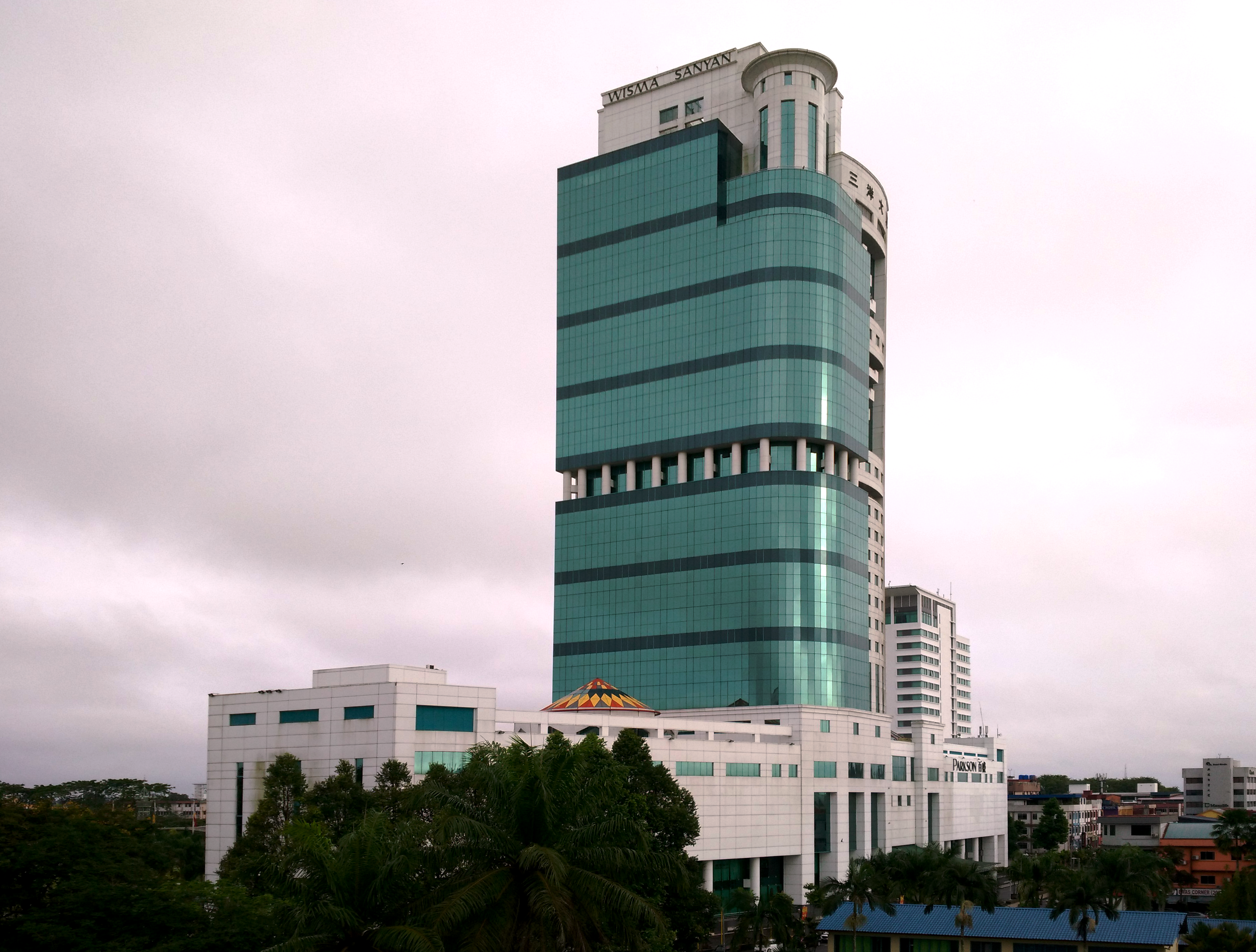
Wisma Sanyan is the tallest building in Sarawak and is an office building cum shopping mall.

- Delta Mall
- Hann's Residence
- Medan Mall
- Sarawak House Shopping Complex
- Star Mega Mall
- The Swan Square
- Wisma Sanyan

=== Sri Aman ===
- Plaza Simanggang

== Selangor ==
=== Ampang Jaya ===
- Ampang Point
- Axis Atrium @ Fiesta Mall
- Galaxy Ampang
- Pandan Kapital Mall
- Spectrum Shopping Mall
- The Campus Ampang
- MidPoint Shopping Complex
- ÆON BiG Ampang
- Kompleks D'star Arena
- Lotus's Ampang

=== Bandar Baru Bangi ===
- Bangi Gateway
- De Centrum Mall
- Pasaraya CS Bangi Avenue
- ECONSAVE BANGI
- Evo Bangi

=== Cheras ===
- ÆON Cheras Selatan Shopping Centre
- BMC Mall (formerly known as ÆON Makhota Cheras)
- Pandan Safari Shopping Complex (permanently closed)

=== Cyberjaya ===
- D'Pulze Shopping Centre
- Gem In Mall
- Shaftsbury Square Cyberjaya
- Tamarind Square

=== Kajang ===
- Metro Point Kajang
- Plaza Metro Kajang

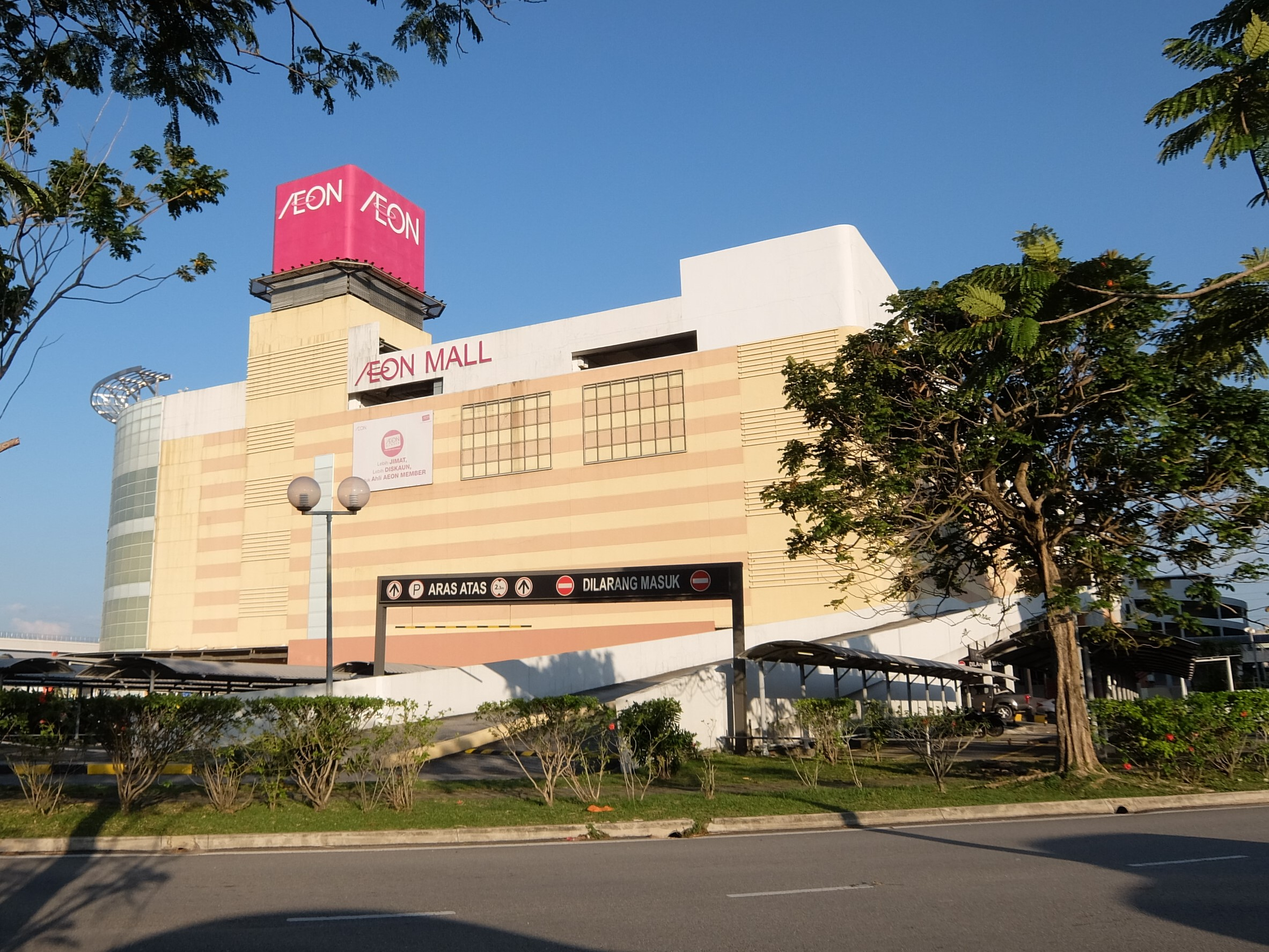
ÆON Bukit Tinggi Shopping Centre at Klang

=== Klang ===
- ÆON Mall Bukit Raja
- ÆON Mall Bukit Tinggi
- Centro Mall
- Galleri Klang Sentral
- GM Klang Wholesale City
- Harbour Place
- Klang Parade
- KSL Esplanade Mall
- Sunway Pier Port Klang (opening in 2027)

=== Kuala Selangor ===
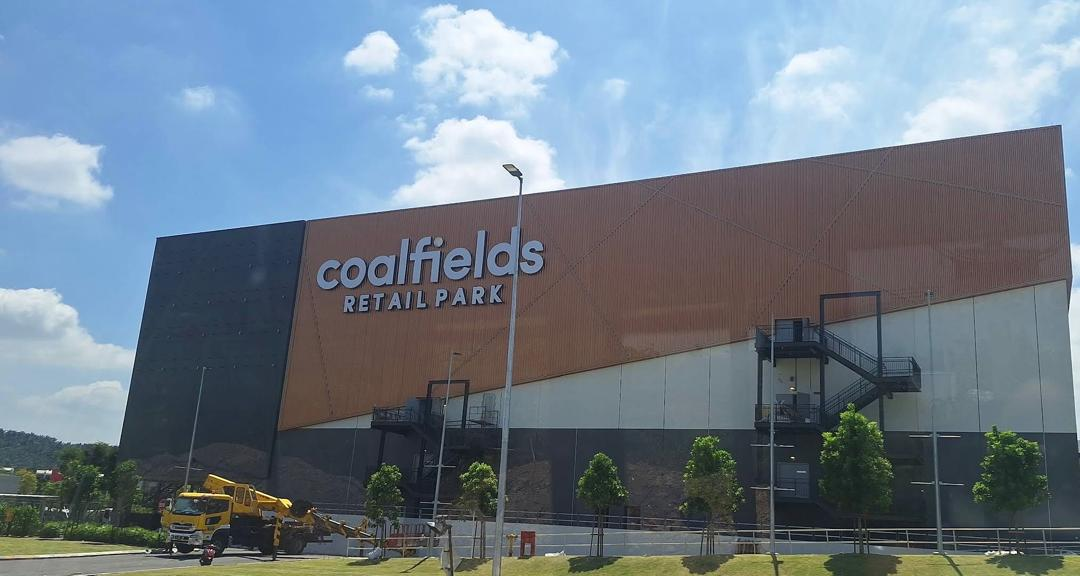
Coalfields Retail Park in Bandar Seri Coalfields

- KIPMall Desa Coalfields
- Coalfields Retail Park
- One Plaza
- Saujana Utama Mall

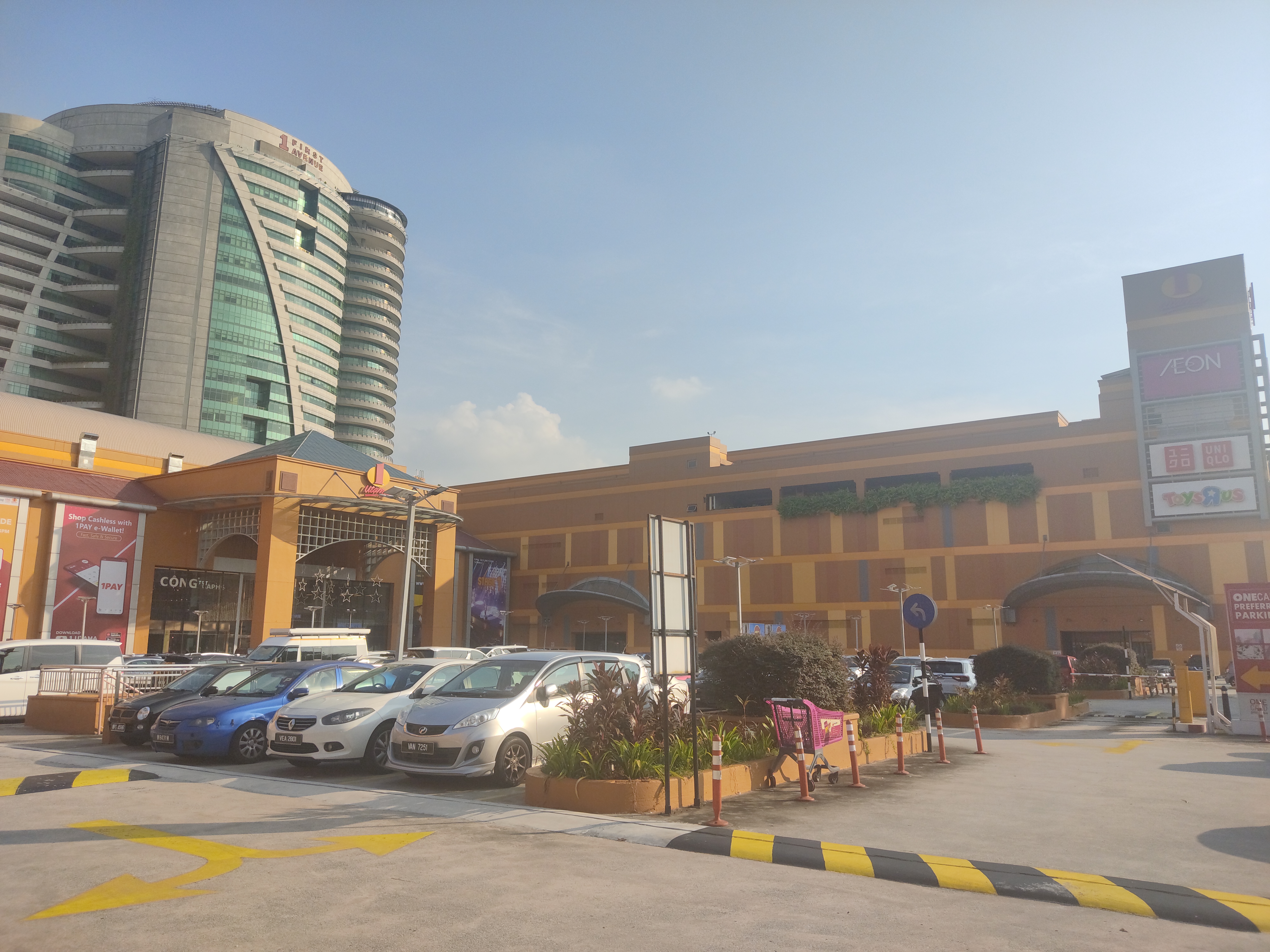
1 Utama Shopping Centre in Petaling Jaya

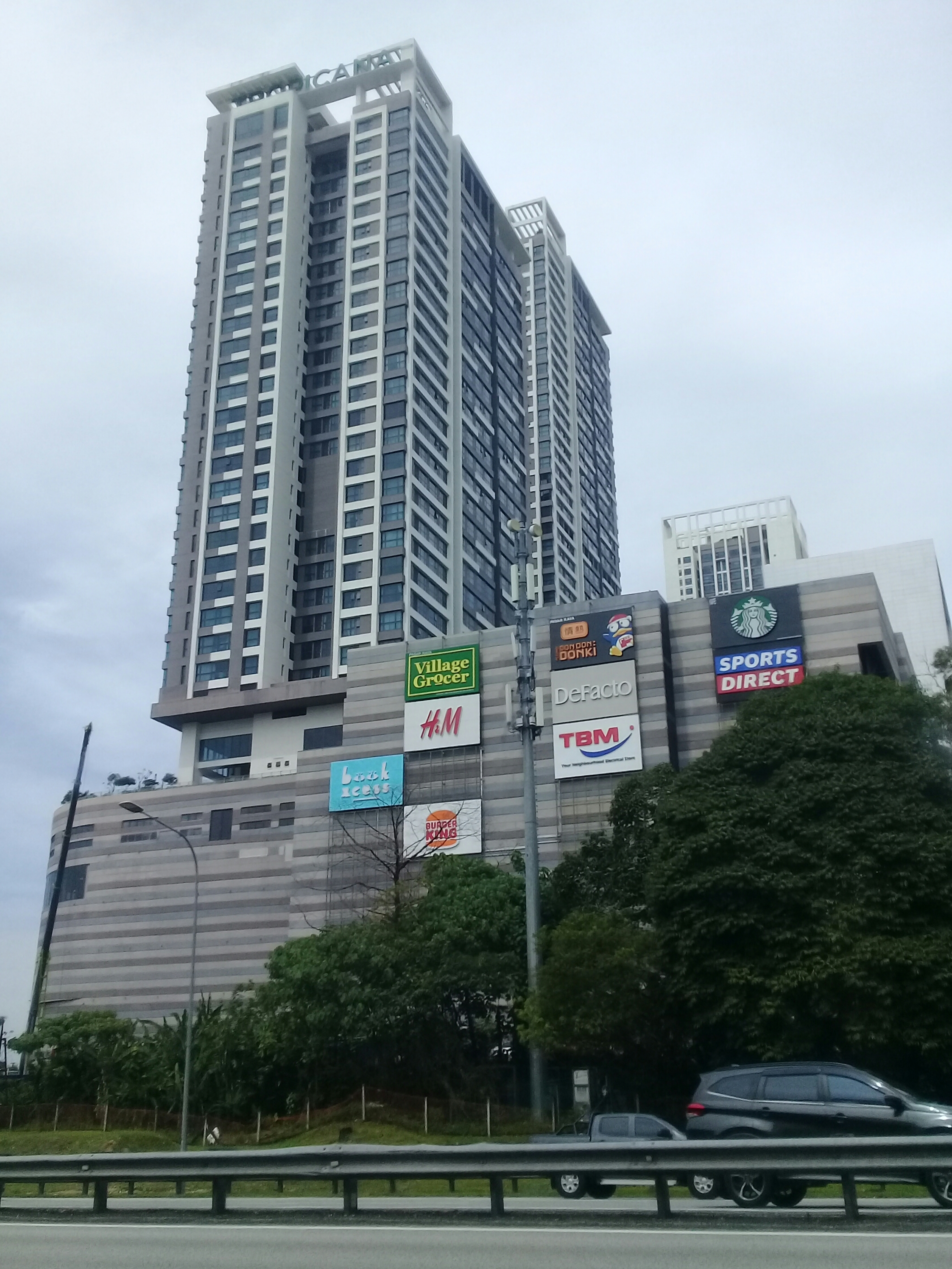
IOI Mall Damansara (formerly Tropicana Gardens Mall) in Petaling Jaya

=== Petaling Jaya ===
- 1 Utama
- IKEA Damansara
- 3 Damansara
- Amcorp Mall
- Atria Shopping Gallery
- CITTA Mall
- The Curve
- Encorp Strand
- Evolve Concept Mall
- Hextar World at Empire City
- IOI Mall Damansara (formerly known as Tropicana Gardens Mall)
- IPC Shopping Centre
- Jaya One
- Imago Jaya Mall (formerly known as Jaya Shopping Centre)
- Megah Rise
- One Square Bandar Utama
- Paradigm Mall Petaling Jaya
- Pj33
- Seventeen Mall
- The Starling
- The Capitol (on 16 November 2026)
- Sunway Giza
- Centerpoint Bandar Utama

=== Rawang ===
- ÆON Rawang Anggun Shopping Centre

=== Selayang ===
- 168 Park Selayang Mall
- Selayang Capitol Complex
- Selayang Mall

=== Semenyih ===
- Setia EcoHill Mall

=== Sepang ===
- Gateway@klia2
- Mitsui Outlet Park KLIA

=== Seri Kembangan ===
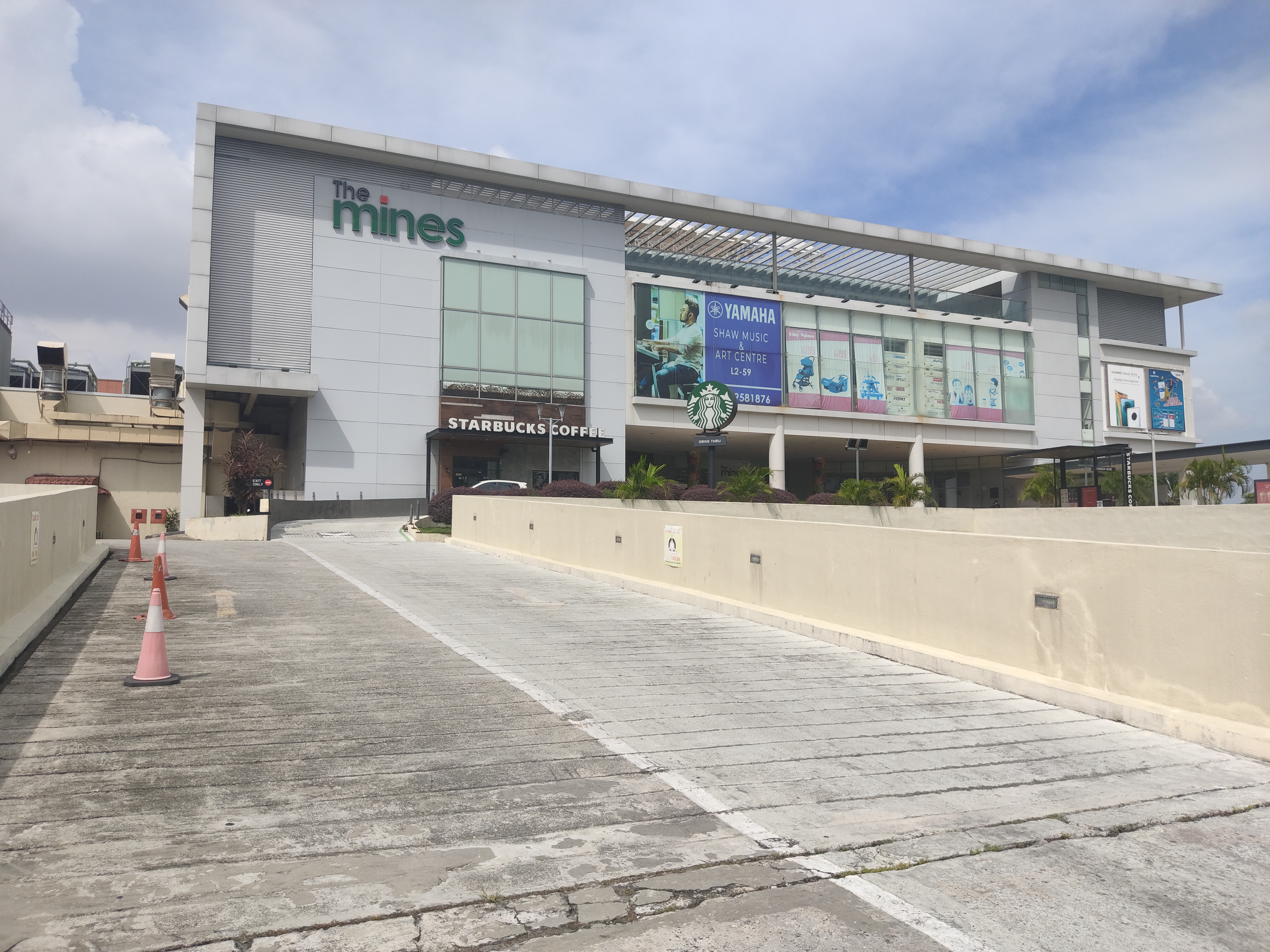
The Mines shopping mall exterior

- ÆON Taman Equine Shopping Centre
- Plaza 63
- The Mines Shopping Mall
- South City Plaza

=== Shah Alam ===
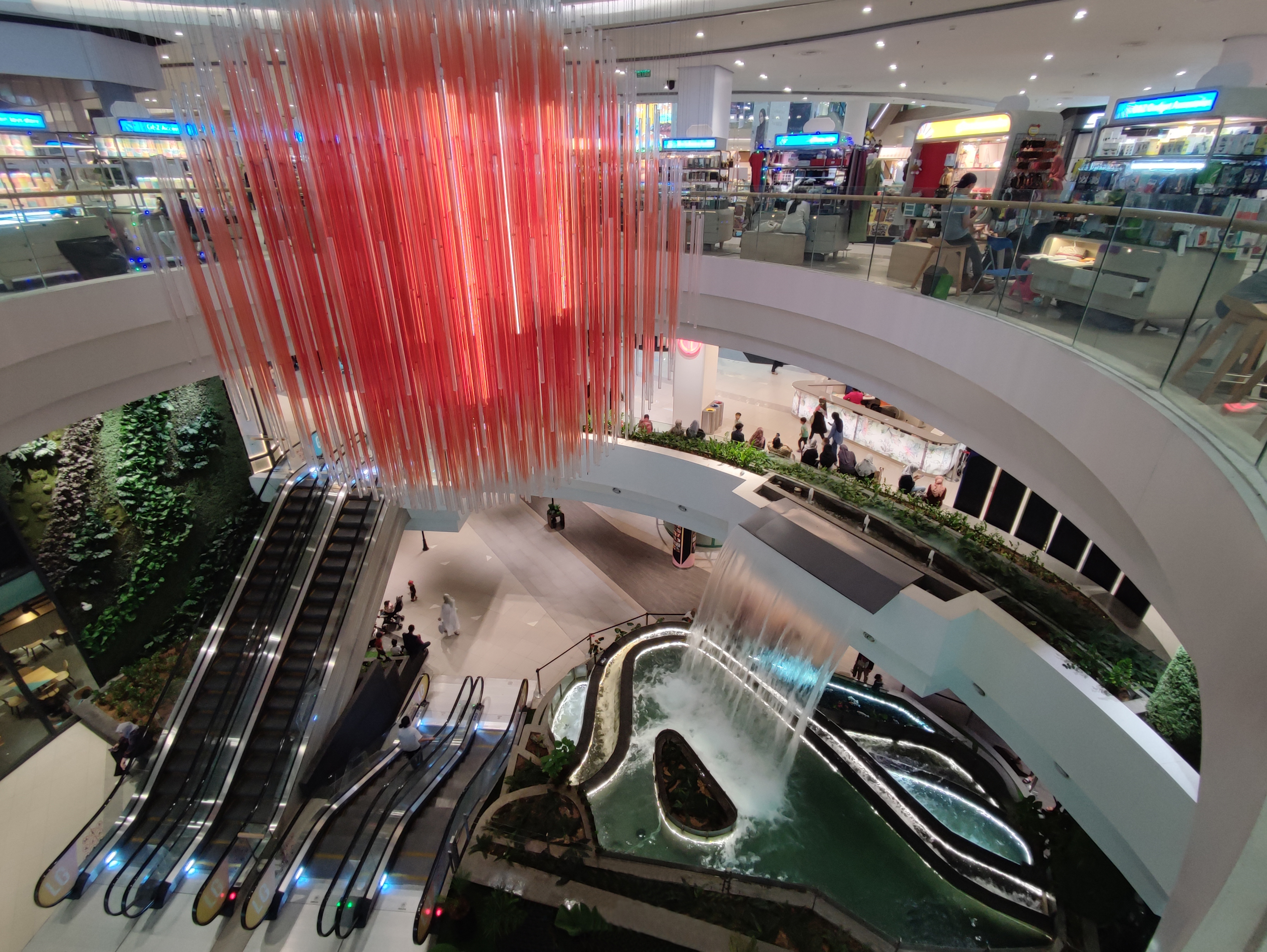
Interior of Central i-City

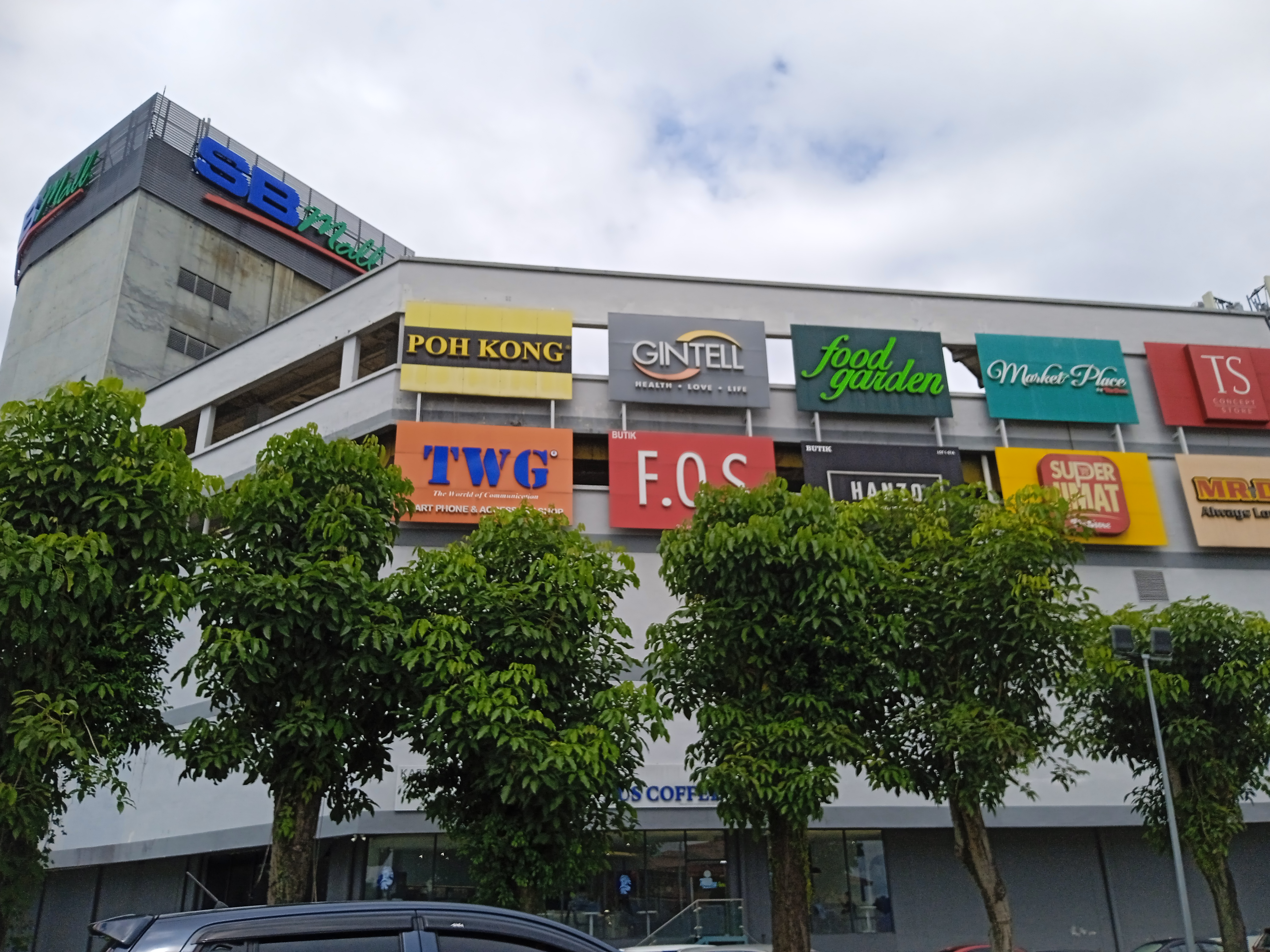
Facade of SB Mall from Jalan Kuala Selangor

- ÆON Mall Shah Alam
- Anggerik Mall
- Central i-City
- Elmina Lakeside Mall
- IRDKL Mall
- Kompleks PKNS Shah Alam
- Ole-Ole Shopping Centre
- Plaza Alam Sentral
- Plaza Shah Alam
- SACC Mall Shah Alam
- SB Mall
- Setia City Mall
- Space U8 Mall
- Star Avenue Lifestyle Mall

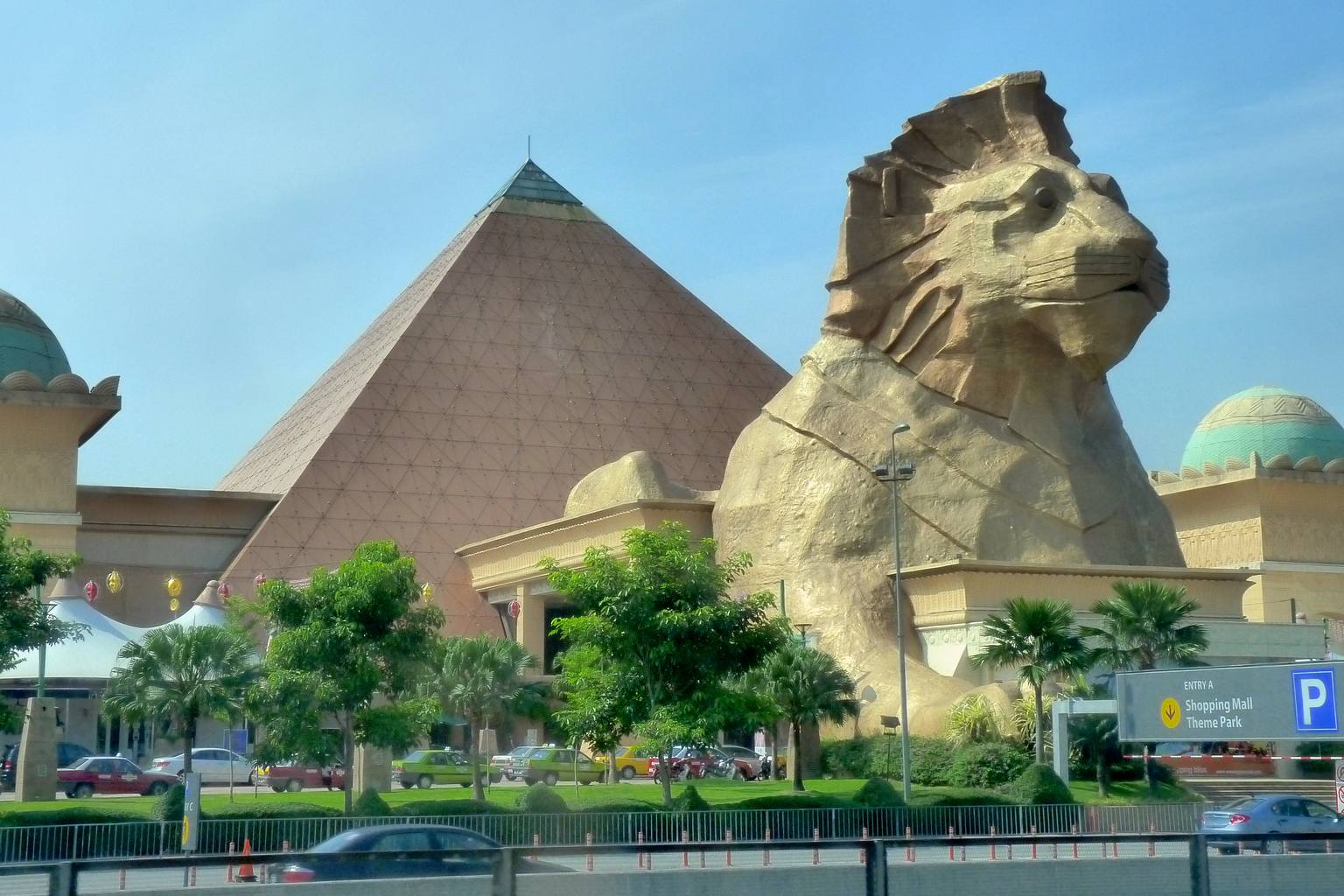
Sunway Pyramid in Subang Jaya is a mall with an Egyptian-inspired pyramid and a lion-designed Sphinx.

=== Subang Jaya ===
- Easyhome Smart Home Life Experience Centre (formerly known as Da Men Mall)
- IOI Mall Puchong
- IOI Rio Mall Puchong (opening in 2030)
- M Square Puchong
- Main Place Mall
- NU Empire Shopping Gallery
- Palazzo 19 Mall
- One City Mall
- Setia Walk, Puchong
- SS15 Courtyard
- Subang Parade
- Summit USJ
- Sunway Pyramid
- Sunway Square Mall

=== Telok Panglima Garang ===
- Gamuda Walk Mall
- Quayside Mall
- Sanctuary Mall

== Terengganu ==
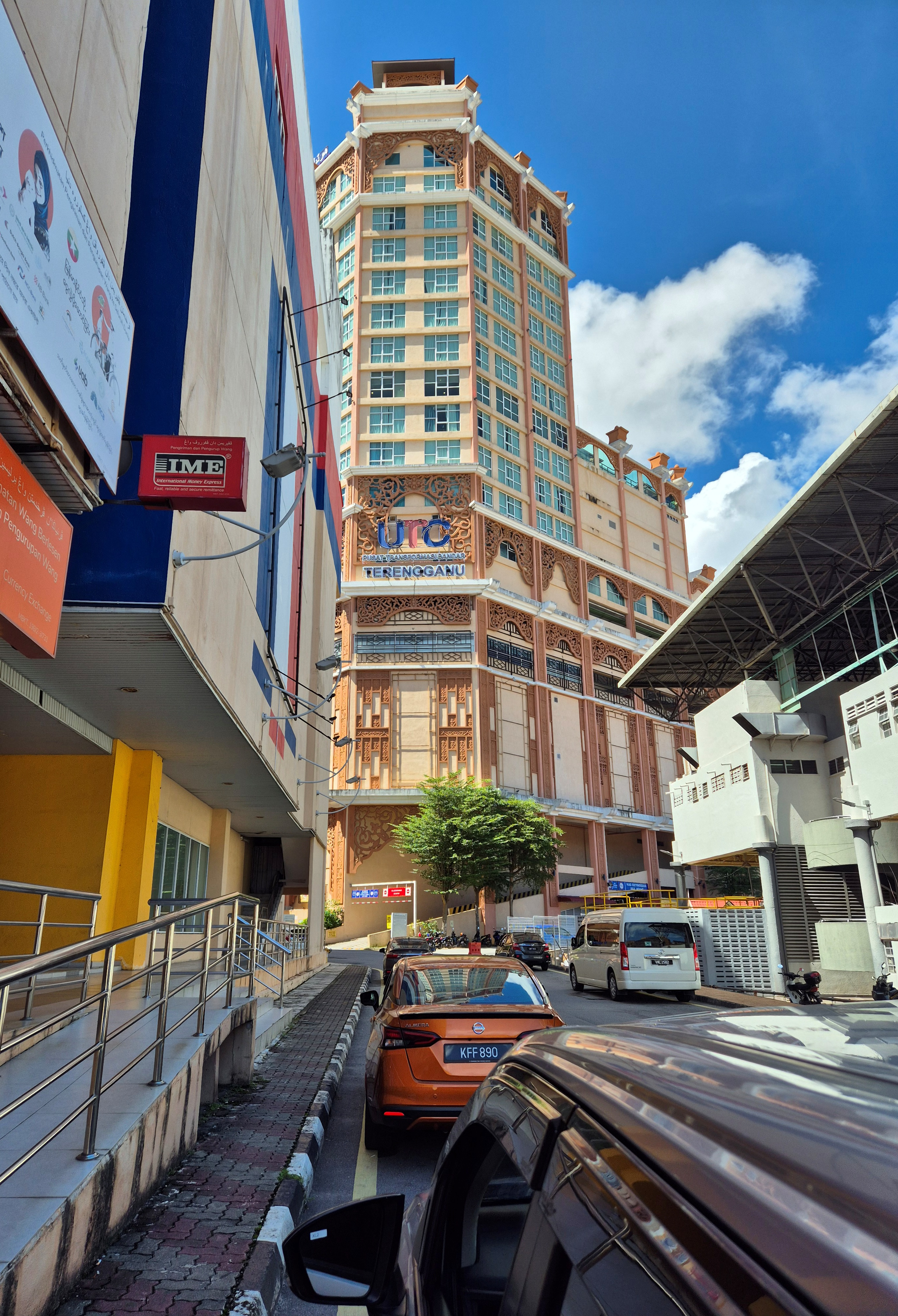
Paya Bunga Square in Kuala Terengganu

=== Kemaman ===
- Kemaman Centre Point
- Mesra Mall

=== Kuala Terengganu ===
- KTCC Mall
- Mayang Mall
- Mydin Mall Kuala Terengganu
- Paya Bunga Sentral
- Paya Bunga Square
- Paya Bunga Plaza

=== Kerteh ===
- Mesra Mall Kerteh
