= Grand Merdeka =

Shopping mall in Kota Kinabalu, Sabah, Malaysia

- Interactive map of the Grand Merdeka area

General information
- Status: Completed
- Location: Sabah, Kota Kinabalu, Malaysia
- Coordinates: 6°3′38″N 116°10′46″E
- Completed: 2017
- Opened: 2 June 2017
- Owner: Grand Merdeka Development Sdn Bhd

Website
- www.grandmerdeka.com

Grand Merdeka is a shoplots comprising shopping centre, offices and mixed multi-storey in Kota Kinabalu, Sabah, Malaysia. It is modelled after the infrastructures in Mutiara Damansara, Selangor. Its shopping mall building was completed in early 2016. While the rest of the building was completed in 2017.
