= Star Mega Mall =

Shopping mall in Sibu, Sarawak, Malaysia

- Location: Sibu, Sarawak; Malaysia
- Coordinates: 2°18′17.6″N 111°51′49.5″E
- Address: Jalan Tunku Abdul Rahman; 96000 Sibu, Sarawak
- Opened: 29 July 2011; 15 years ago
- Developer: Daesim Group
- Manager: Daesim Management Sdn Bhd.
- Num. of stores: 100+
- Num. of anchor tenants: 1
- Floor area: 280,000 sq ft (26,000 m^{2})
- Floors: 3
- Parking: 1,000

Star Mega Mall is a shopping mall located in Sibu, Sarawak, Malaysia. The mall houses the first hypermarket in Sibu, Daesco Hypermarket and Departmental Store as well as the largest all-in-one shopping mall in Sarawak's Central Region.

== Overview ==
The plan to develop Star Mega Mall started in 1998. Construction works began only in August 2007 on a 4-hectare (9.9-acre) land in Jalan Tunku Abdul Rahman, about 6 km (3.7 mi) from the Sibu town centre. The mall was constructed at a total cost of over RM40 million.

The mall was officially declared open by then Second Finance Minister Dato Sri Wong Soon Koh in late September 2011.

== Tenants ==
Anchor tenants

- Daesco Hypermarket and Departmental Store (Note: Occupies the second and third floor of the mall, spanning 160,000 sqft.)

Other tenants

- Bata
- Guardian
- Kioda
- Marrybrown
- Maxis Store
- MR.D.I.Y. (Note: MR. D.I.Y.'s 221st outlet.)
- Oppo Experience Store
- Pezzo/SugarBun
- Sushi King
- TRIO by Jerasia
- Watsons

== Future expansion plan ==
In December 2021, Daesim Group of Companies chairman, Dato Lau Ngie Hua told journalists of early plan to build phase 2 of the mall which would accommodate more facilities such has a bigger food court, a cinema with seven halls and also more than 400 stalls.
