= Jaya One =

Shopping mall in Petaling, Selangor, Malaysia

- Coordinates: 3°7′5.4588″N 101°38′8.7″E
- Address: 72A, Jln Profesor Diraja Ungku Aziz, Seksyen 13, 46200 Petaling Jaya, Selangor
- Opened: 2008 (The Square, formerly known as Palm Square); 2013 (The School)
- Developer: Tetap Tiara Sdn Bhd
- Manager: Jaya One Management Sdn Bhd
- Owner: Tetap Tiara Sdn Bhd
- Num. of stores: 53 (39, The School; 14, The Square)
- Num. of anchor tenants: AEON Big, BUMP Bouldering, Celebrity Fitness, Mr D.I.Y., NOKO, Common Ground
- Floors: 5 (Excluding car park, including basement floors)
- Parking: 5 (Ground floor, 4 basement levels); 2,400 parking bays
- Website: https://www.jayaone.com.my/

Jaya One is a neighbourhood shopping mall located at Section 13, Petaling Jaya, Selangor, Malaysia. It is currently split into The Square, The School and Retail Linkway.

== History ==
Developed and owned by Tetap Tiara Sdn Bhd, Jaya One first opened in 2008, with its Phase 1 Palm Square.

In 2013, Jaya One was expanded with the opening of The School, Malaysia's first child enrichment mall.

In 2018, following the closure of Palm Square (also known as 'The Palm') in March, reopened it as The Square to further the mall.

In 2020, following the closure of its previous anchor tenant Cold Storage, the first "hybrid" AEON BIG hypermarket opened in July at The School.

== Stores and services ==
Some of the anchor tenants currently at Jaya One include hypermarket AEON BIG, rock climbing center BUMP Bouldering, fitness center Celebrity Fitness, hardware store (Mr. DIY), lifestyle store (NOKO) and co-working space Common Ground.

Other stores and services include Guardian, Ippudo, Apple Samgyupsal, GO Noodle House, Nando's, OldTown White Coffee, Subway restaurant, and Starbucks Coffee.

Jaya One also houses Pop The Arcade, the first pop-up retail space for startups of its kind in Malaysia.

PJ Live Arts, Selangor's first independent theatre dedicated to family and comedy shows is also located here.

Two non-governmental organizations, Kechara Food Bank and Parents Without Partners (PWP) are also based there.

In addition Jaya One also contains various offices and businesses in its buildings, ranging from banks and properties to architecture firms.

On Friday evenings, the mall opens one of its floors to roller skating.
