= Plaza Shell =

Office building in Sabah, Malaysia

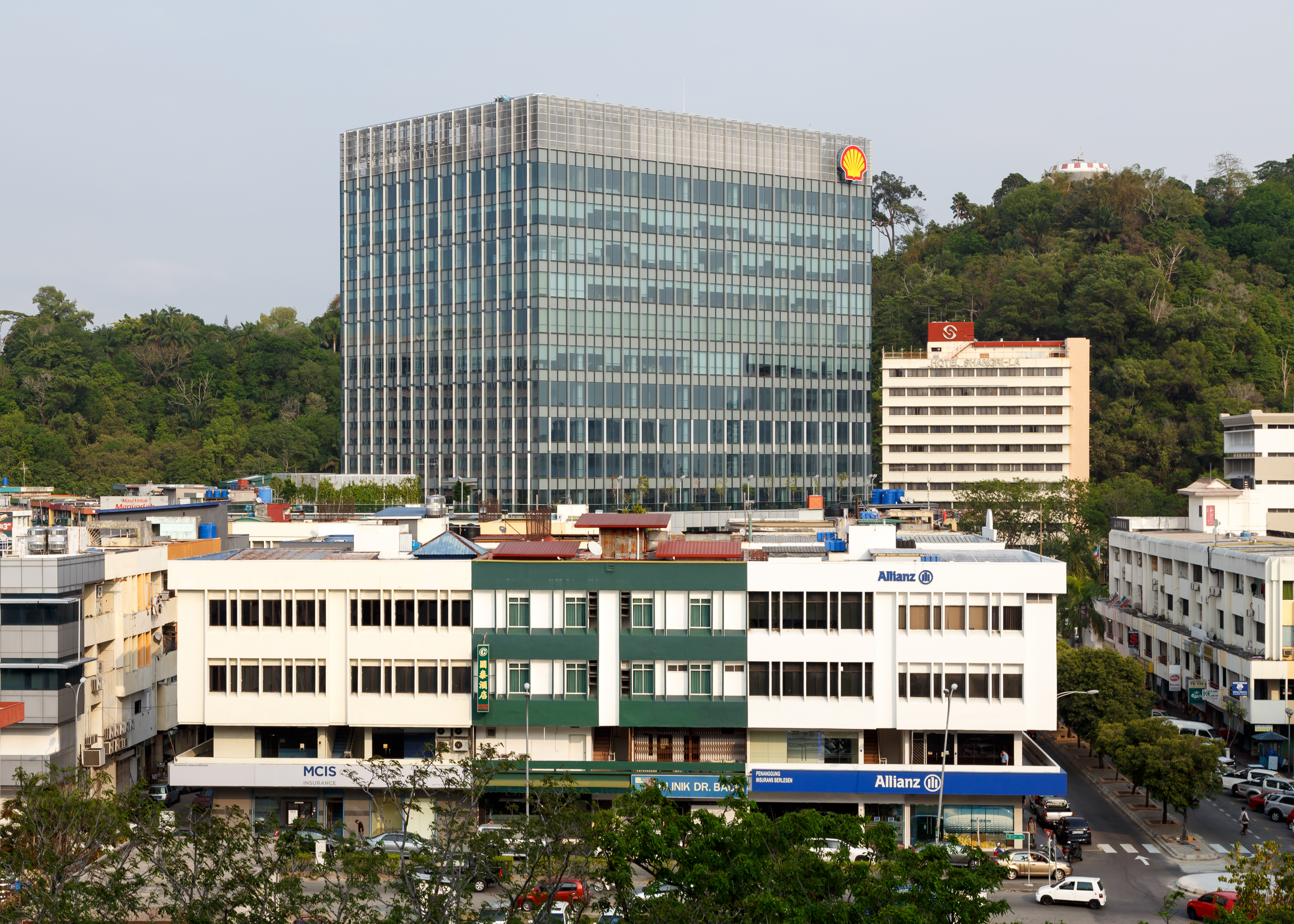
- Plaza Shell on 31 March 2016.
- Interactive map of the Plaza Shell area

General information
- Status: Completed
- Location: Sabah, Kota Kinabalu, Malaysia
- Coordinates: 5°58′37″N 116°4′28″E
- Completed: 2015
- Inaugurated: November 2015
- Owner: Hap Seng Group; Shell Malaysia

Plaza Shell is the office building for Shell Malaysia in Kota Kinabalu, Sabah, Malaysia. The building is an administration area for the management of supply and marketing of retail fuels, lubricants, commercial fuels, aviation and marine products for Sabah markets. The building also include a showroom for Mercedes-Benz, a shopping centre and medical clinics, pharmacy and physiotherapy clinics. The building's opening was officiated in November 2015 by the Chief Minister of Sabah, Musa Aman.
