= Park Royal (disambiguation) =

Park Royal is an area in North West London, England.

Park Royal may also refer to:

- Park Royal Vehicles
- Park Royal hotels, Mexico
- Park Royal Shopping Centre, West Vancouver, British Columbia, Canada
  - Park Royal Exchange, a major transit exchange located at the Park Royal Shopping Centre
- Parkroyal on Pickering, Singapore
