= Miao & WafuPafu =

2007 Malaysia comic series

- 2015 - 2024 logo. Colors and border changed throughout the following years.
- Author: Jian Goh
- Illustrator: Jian Goh
- Website: https://miaowafupafu.com/
- Current status/schedule: Ongoing
- Launch date: 2007
- Genre(s): Lifestyle, humor
- Original language: English

Miao & WafuPafu is a Malaysia webcomic and comic series that created by Jian Goh, began in 2007.

== Plot ==
Miao & WafuPafu tells the encounters in Miao's daily life. Being an anthropomorphic animal cartoon character and also an alter ego of Jian Goh, he explores and experiences different types of art, culture, travel and lifestyle in his homeland, Kuching, and the outer world. Miao is also surrounded by two hamsters, Wafu and Pafu, his family members and friends, who bring development to the stories.

== Development ==
During Jian Goh's fourth year as an undergraduate of Bachelor's Degree in Electronic Engineering, his friend introduced him to blogging, which was also a subject assignment whereby students had to blog for an entire semester. In 2007, Goh created Miao, a male orange tabby cat alter ego cartoon character to blog about his encounters through attached illustrations and some texts, which later developed into a series of blog comic strips. Goh also added his real life two pet hamsters, Wafu and Pafu, into his works to fulfill readers' satisfaction, thus creating the title Miao & WafuPafu.

Jian Goh stated that the creation of character settings was not done with proper planning, as they are merely designed based on their appearances, interests and personality. He also dreamed of his comic characters becoming a brand with commercial values, in which the ideas were granted in the later years. Miao & WafuPafu became a registered trademark under Space Voyager Log Publication (太空航海日志出版社).

Despite Miao & WafuPafu being well received on the internet, especially after making blogging contests participations in Jason Mumbles's food blog, Lowyat forum and Nuffnang in the beginning of 2010s, and received more award nominations, however, due to lack of real life advertising, the first Miao & WafuPafu physical comic book, Once Upon a Miao: Stories from the Other Side of Malaysia experienced low amount of sales. It was later Once Upon a Miao subsequent volume sales were improved through book fairs, book signings, interviews and art talks.

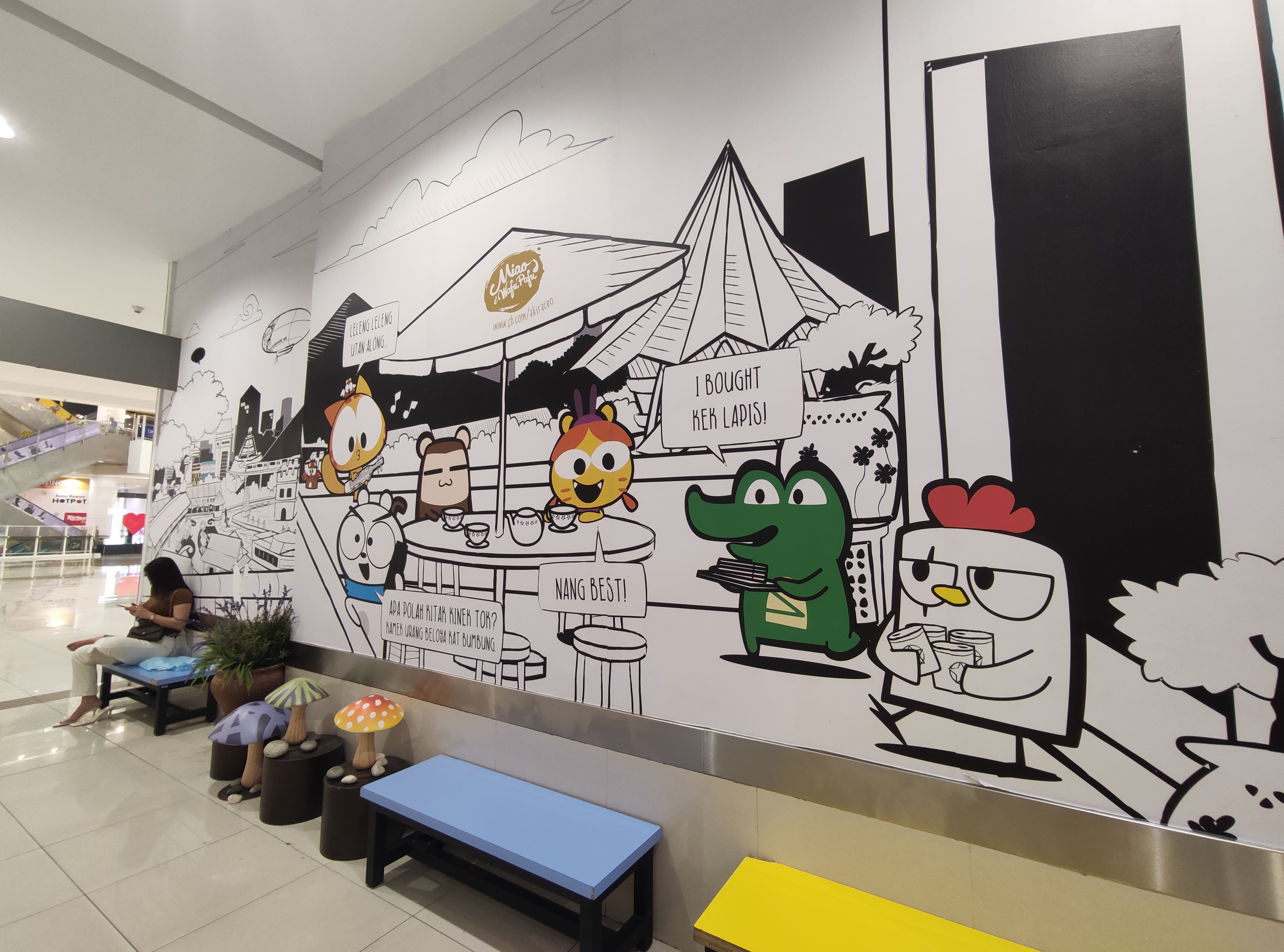
Miao & WafuPafu wall art at ÆON Mall Kuching Central ground floor washroom.

The character designs of Miao & WafuPafu change drastically over the years, but still retaining their essential features. In 2007, due to Jian Goh's limited student budget, he used computer mouse for line art and colouring instead of graphics tablet, giving the illustrations the characteristics of logo design. Around the early 2020s, Goh's digital drawing tool had been switched to tablet.

== Characters ==
=== Miao family ===
Miao
The main character of the series. Also known as Jian Goh, a Kuchingite who is portrayed as the orange tabby cat that loves cats. His hobbies are drawing, enjoying food, traveling and others. Jian Goh had a regret about naming the character without careful consideration.

Papamiao
Father of Miao that loves dogs. Despite behaving conservative and strict in front of Miao, he also shows love and care when the family members demand assistance. He is portrayed as a white dog with a necktie.

Mamamiao
Mother of Miao. The most quiet character in the series, and also a patient of depression. She is portrayed as a yellow bunny with curly short hair.

Big Sis
Eldest sister of Miao. She becomes the housekeeper after Mamamiao had lost motivation to do housekeeping. She is also an expert in beauty and health. Her comic appearance is a white horse with long tied hair.

Second Sis
Second elder sister of Miao. A housekeeping assistant of Big Sis. She also raises a pet cat. Her comic appearance is a light brown monkey with a hair tie above her forehead.

Momo
Miao's youngest sister that loves hamsters. Despite being a quarreler, she has a close tie with Miao and also likes to follow him. She is portrayed as a tiny mouse with a bow attached at the back.

Wafu and Pafu
Miao's pet hamsters that passed away and reincarnated as an angel and a devil. Their names are inspired by Jian Goh's Chinese language calling in his dream, "bountiful blessings (Chinese: 万福百福; pinyin: Wànfú bǎifú)".

=== Friends ===
Bokiu
Mus
Lingling
Rippy
Haw
Tiffany

== Media ==
=== Comics ===
- Miao & WafuPafu webcomics
- Once Upon a Miao series

No.	Book title	(Malaysia) Date of publication	(Malaysia) ISBN
1	Once Upon a Miao: Stories from the Other Side of Malaysia	31 July 2015	ISBN 9789671346501
1	(Remastered) Jian Goh's Once Upon a Miao: I Love My Hometown	10 March 2025	ISBN 9786299834113
2	Once Upon a Miao 2: Stories from the Other Side of Malaysia	1 April 2017	ISBN 9789671346518
2	(Remastered) Once Upon a Miao 2: Crushes, Friendship & Chaos	10 March 2025	ISBN 9786299834120
3	Once Upon a Miao 3: Even More Stories from the Other Side of Malaysia	1 January 2019	ISBN 9789671346525
3	(Remastered) Once Upon a Miao 3: She Took Me to the Park. I Took Her Back.	8 October 2025	ISBN 9786299834137
4	Once Upon a Miao 4: My School Holidays (stylised as Once Upon a Mi4o)	9 January 2023	ISBN 9786299834106

== Reception ==
Two other comic artists, Cheeming Boey and The Potato Couple also gave positive feedback and compliments on Once Upon a Miao 4: My School Holidays for deep diving into Jian Goh's personal life struggles without losing its "charm".
