= Call signs in the United States =

FCC issued identifiers assigned to radio and television stations

Call signs in the United States are identifiers assigned to radio and television stations, which are issued by the Federal Communications Commission (FCC) and, in the case of most government stations, the National Telecommunications and Information Administration (NTIA). They consist of from 3 to 9 letters and digits, with their composition determined by a station's service category. By international agreement, all call signs starting with the letters K, N, and W, as well as AAA-ALZ, are reserved exclusively for use in the United States.

AM, FM, TV and shortwave broadcasting stations can request their own call letters, as long as they are unique. The FCC policy covering broadcasting stations limits them to call signs that start with a "K" or a "W", with "K" call signs generally reserved for stations west of the Mississippi River, and "W" limited to stations east of the river. Amateur stations can receive call signs starting with all of the letters "A", "K", "N", and "W". Formerly, prefixes beginning with "A" were exclusively assigned to U.S. Army stations and prefixes beginning with "N" to U.S. Navy stations.

== Broadcasting stations ==
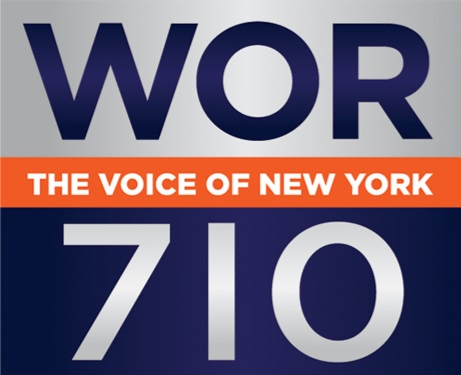
Example of a radio station that prominently promotes its call letters. (WOR, New York City)

Other stations downplay their call letters, in favor of an easily remembered slogan. This is also the standard practice in most other countries.(KGMZ-FM, San Francisco)

Although most transmitters regulated by the Federal Communications Commission (FCC) are issued call signs for their official identification, the general public is most familiar with the ones used by radio and TV broadcasting stations. However, there is a wide variety in how much emphasis stations give to their call signs; for some it is the primary way they establish public identity, while others largely ignore their call signs, considering a moniker or slogan to be more easily remembered by listeners (and those filling in diaries for the Nielsen Audio ratings measurement). In the United States, the only time broadcasting stations are required to mention their call signs is during station identification announcements, made at a "natural break in programming" as close to the beginning of each hour as possible.

Television stations have the option of displaying a small graphic or text ("digital on-screen graphic" or "bug") at the bottom of the screen listing their call sign, community of license, and other identifying information. Sometimes station identification is displayed non-intrusively in small type during short promotions, either for an upcoming show or their next local newscast (even incorporating these identifications at the start of newscasts), that air just before the top of each hour. FM stations with HD Radio digital subchannels must individually identify each program stream, but do not need to do so in any particular form; most licensees use the form "WXXX HD2", but this is not part of their call sign.

A few AM stations have had the same call letters for 100 years or more: KDKA in Pittsburgh, Pennsylvania, has been in continuous use since 1920, while WBZ in Boston, KYW in Philadelphia, and KWG in Stockton, California, all date back to 1921. At the other extreme, reflecting multiple changes in ownership and format, are stations which have changed call letters numerous times, for example KXFN in Saint Louis, Missouri, has switched ten times since 1925.

=== Call signs meanings ===
While the earliest radio call signs were randomly or sequentially assigned and intended merely to distinguish transmitters, they soon became an important part of a station's identity, and since the mid-1920s government regulators have allowed station owners to choose their own. Thousands of radio and TV stations have been established, with a wide variety of reasons for choosing particular call signs. Some common categories include:

- Slogans: It is sometimes difficult to determine which came first: a station's call sign, or a slogan attached to it. However, some well-documented examples of call letters being chosen to reflect an existing slogan include: WGN and WGN-TV in Chicago, standing for "World's Greatest Newspaper", used by their original owner, the Chicago Tribune; WIS in Columbia, South Carolina, the "Wonderful Iodine State"; WPTF, Raleigh, North Carolina, which references the motto of previous owner the Durham Life Insurance Company, "We Protect the Family" while Z88.3, in Central Florida prizes itself on its "Positive Hits", with the call-sign WPOZ.
- Owners: The major owned-and-operated stations of the Big Three television networks—ABC, CBS and NBC—have traditionally had call signs reflecting the network abbreviations. Stations operated by schools and universities commonly incorporate their school's initials, including WWVU-FM (West Virginia University, Morgantown), and KUOM (University of Minnesota, Minneapolis).
- Locations: Three stations have call signs that fully spell out their community of license: WACO-FM (Waco, Texas), WARE (Ware, Massachusetts) and WISE-FM (Wise, Virginia). Other stations reference their community of license or designated market area (DMA) with an abbreviation or initialism, such as WRAL-TV (Raleigh, North Carolina), WCSC-TV (Charleston, South Carolina), WLOX (Biloxi, Mississippi), WSAV-TV (Savannah, Georgia), WPGH-TV (Pittsburgh, Pennsylvania), or WTSP (Tampa-St. Petersburg, Florida).
- Numbers: Numerous television stations have chosen call letters that reference their channel number, either spelled out or using Roman numerals: WDIV-TV (channel 4, Detroit, Michigan), WXII-TV (channel 12, Winston–Salem, North Carolina), WXXV-TV (channel 25, Gulfport, Mississippi), KXII (also channel 12, Sherman, Texas), WIIC-TV (now WPXI) (channel 11, Pittsburgh), WPVI-TV (channel 6, Philadelphia), WIVB-TV (channel 4, Buffalo, New York), WTWO (channel 2, Terre Haute, Indiana), KIXE-TV (channel 9, Redding, California - And the last letter selected as it was part of the Educational network, now PBS), and WXXI-TV (channel 21, Rochester). Some, like WGRZ (channel 2, Buffalo) and WDIO-DT (channel 10, Duluth), use letters which have similarities to numerals; in those examples, the "Z" in WGRZ resembles a "2", while the "IO" in WDIO resembles a "10". Examples on the AM band have historically included KIXI in Seattle, which previously broadcast on 910 kHz ("IX-I"); and KIIS (now KEIB) in Los Angeles, which originated on 1150 kHz (as the letters IIS resemble 115, its frequency in myriahertz).
- Network: Several stations include their network affiliate, such as east coast flagship stations WCBS-TV, WNBC, and WABC-TV, which are affiliated with CBS, NBC, and ABC respectively, all located in New York City, and west coast flagship stations KCBS-TV, KNBC, and KABC-TV in Los Angeles. Outside of flagship stations include WFOX-TV (Jacksonville, Florida) and KFOX-TV (El Paso, Texas), both affiliates of the Fox network, WPBS-TV (Watertown, New York) and KPBS (San Diego, California) both affiliates of PBS, KMEE-TV (Kingman, Arizona), an affiliate of MeTV, and KMYT (Tulsa, Oklahoma) and WMNT-CD (Toledo, Ohio), both affiliates of MyNetworkTV. Several Ion Television stations pertain the "PX" within their names as a call back to the network's original name, PAX, with an extra letter for either their location (WPXN-TV in New York), area where they serve (WQPX-TV in Scranton, Pennsylvania, in which the Q stands for Susquehanna Valley), or to disambiguate from other Pax/Ion stations (WPXJ-TV in Buffalo, New York). Many call signs pertain their previous affiliation, such as WMYT-TV in Charlotte, North Carolina which became an affiliate of The CW network in 2025, or a defunct network, such as KWBQ which stands for The WB Albuquerque, or WUPA, which stands for UPN Atlanta.
- Words: Very rarely some call signs are named after words. Such as KAKE in Wichita, Kansas named after, and pronounced like the word "cake" (sic). KOLD-TV in Tucson, Arizona, which is pronounced like the word "cold", and derived from then-co-owned KOOL-TV in Phoenix, KARE-TV in Minneapolis which is pronounced and is a homophone to the word "care", WOOD-TV in Grand Rapids, Michigan, pronounced like the word "wood", and came from radio sister station, which was funded originally by furniture manufacturers, WINK-TV in Fort Myers, Florida named after the word "wink", and KEYE-TV in Austin, Texas, named after the word eye, both alluding to the CBS Eyemark logo, WISH-TV in Indianapolis, which is pronounced as "wish" (as in making a wish), WKOW in Madison, Wisconsin, taken from the word "cow", deriving from the Wisconsin dairy industry, WOLF-TV in Hazelton, Pennsylvania, named after the canine, KUBE-TV in Baytown, Texas, named after the word "cube", WALE-LD in Montgomery, Alabama, named after the mammal, and WHAM-TV in Rochester, New York, taken from former sister radio station, and pronounced like "wham" as in the onomatopoeia. While some station spell out words, the call letters are pronounced individually, such as WHO-DT in Des Moines, Iowa.

=== Geographical separation of K and W call signs ===
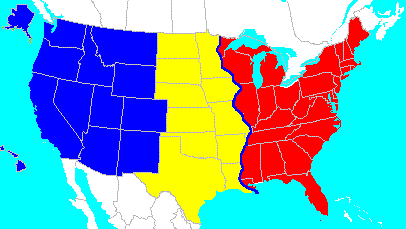
Historically, the west (blue) has normally had K calls and the east (red) has normally had W. The middle area (yellow) received W calls from 1912 until January 1923, when a boundary shift to the Mississippi River transferred it to K territory.

Following a practice inaugurated in 1912 when the federal government first licensed radio stations, beginning in 1921 broadcasting stations have generally been assigned call signs beginning with "K" when their community of license is in the west, and with "W" in the east. (The FCC proposed ending this policy in 1987, in order to allow unrestricted assignments of K and W stations throughout the country. However, after receiving public comments, it was decided to retain the rule, because of its convenience as a geographical identifier).

The original boundary ran northward from the Texas–New Mexico border. In early 1923 the boundary was moved to its present location, the Mississippi River, in order to balance the populations in the two regions. The geographical separation of "K" and "W" prefixes applies only to radio and television broadcasting stations, and is not followed for weather radio, highway advisory radio, and time signal stations, nor does it apply to auxiliary licenses held by broadcast stations, such as studio-transmitter links and inter-city relay stations.

For stations in U.S. possessions, too, the Mississippi River is the boundary. Puerto Rico and the U.S. Virgin Islands are east of the river, and all their stations have been given standard "W" call signs. The Pacific Ocean territories—Guam, the Northern Mariana Islands, and American Samoa—are in western, "K" territory, although assignments there have been less consistent. All but one of these stations have "K" calls; the exception is WVUV-FM in Fagaitua, American Samoa, which received its call while it was paired with a now defunct AM station, WVUV.

The 1923 boundary shift meant that a number of existing stations with "W" call letters were in a section of country that was now being issued "K" call letters, but these earlier stations were allowed to keep their now non-standard call signs. These include WBAP (Fort Worth, Texas), and WDAF-FM and WDAF-TV (Kansas City, Missouri), which inherited their calls from the original WDAF (now KFNZ).

Although a long established convention, the K–W division has not always been rigidly followed. One prominent exception is KDKA, in Pittsburgh, Pennsylvania, which was licensed in 1920 during a short period when new land stations were issued call signs from a block of letters that had been reserved for ship stations. Another is KYW, which was originally launched in Chicago by the Westinghouse corporation in 1921 and later moved to Philadelphia: the call sign was temporarily transferred to Cleveland, where it was used from 1956 to 1965.

The K-W division figured in another case that was ultimately decided in federal court. In 1979 the Commission denied a request to conform the call sign of WGNU-FM (now WARH), licensed to Granite City, Illinois, with co-owned KWK (now KXFN), St. Louis, Missouri, to become "KWK-FM." The Commission said to issue a K call sign to a station licensed to a small community on the east bank of the Mississippi would confuse listeners as to the station's location, conforming it with a K call sign of a station licensed to a much larger community on the west river bank. The U.S. Court of Appeals for the District of Columbia Circuit disagreed and reversed the Commission, holding that granting conformances in the past in almost identical cases required the Commission to follow precedent and grant the "KWK-FM" conformance.

The FCC has also been lenient in the case of relocations that move a station to the other side of the boundary, especially when close to the Mississippi River, and in the two states that are divided by the river, Minnesota and Louisiana. The most extreme example occurred in 2013, when television station KJWP was allowed to keep its callsign even after moving from Jackson, Wyoming, to Wilmington, Delaware; the station changed its callsign to WDPN-TV in 2018.

In 2024, Tegna switched the call letters of KMPX, a television station in the Dallas–Fort Worth metroplex to KFAA-TV, which are similar to the calls of its sister television station, WFAA (the latter were assigned to its former sister station in 1922 before the next year's boundary shift, and retained by that television station since 1950) and providing complementary call sign branding for both stations in the same market.

=== Three-letter call signs ===
Starting in 1921, most broadcasting stations were assigned three-letter call signs. However, within a few years there would be hundreds of stations, and there were not enough three-letter calls to go around, so beginning in April and May 1922 most new broadcasting stations were instead issued four-letter calls. Over the next few years a small number of additional three-letter calls were authorized, with the final grant made in 1930 to WIS in Columbia, South Carolina.

In the past, base three-letter calls could only be shared by stations located in the same community and under common ownership. Beginning in the mid-1980s stations which were previously co-owned but later separated no longer were required to have one of the stations give up the three-letter call, which is why WWL and WWL-TV in New Orleans can still share the assignment.

Under current FCC regulations in force since 1998, the limits on reassigning three-letter call signs have been relaxed. The restriction requiring a common community of license was removed, and an owner of a station with a three-letter base call sign can now request the same three-letter call (with an "-FM", "-TV", "-DT", or "-LP" suffix as necessary) for any station under common ownership. CBS Radio most prominently took advantage of this rule to use the goodwill of those calls to launch sports radio sister stations on FM: resurrecting WJZ and adding WJZ-FM in Baltimore, as well as WBZ-FM in Boston.

In most cases the FCC will not reissue a three-letter call sign after all the stations that had been using it switch to four-letter calls, but there have been a few exceptions where a station has been permitted to reclaim an "abandoned" three-letter call. This happened most recently in 2000, when KKHJ in Los Angeles was allowed to change back to KHJ, fourteen years after it had last used the three-letter call. The justification that the FCC accepted was that the first two letters of "KKHJ" are pronounced "caca" in Spanish, which was considered offensive.

=== Suffixes ===
As the number of broadcasting stations has increased, the FCC has adopted a number of suffixes for use by FM and TV stations to allow multiple stations to share the same "base" three- or four-letter call sign. (AM and shortwave stations have never had "-AM" or "-SW" or any other suffixes.) For example, in addition to an FM station with the call letters WFOX, there are also WFOX-TV and a low-power FM station, WFOX-LP. And in addition to shortwave station KSDA, there is also a KSDA-FM.

Suffixes are optional for full power FM and TV stations, unless another station shares the same three- or four-letter base call sign, requiring a differentiation between the two stations. Reviewed below are the various broadcasting station suffixes:

- FM: The FM radio band was established on January 1, 1941, and from the beginning educational stations received standard unique four-letter call signs. Commercial stations within the original FM band were assigned transmitting frequencies that spanned from 43.1 MHz to 49.9 MHz, and the FCC initially issued these stations standardized call signs that included the last two digits of their frequency plus a common closing letter or letters that indicated their community. This resulted in call signs that were hard for the public to differentiate, for example, as of February 1942 there were nine commercial New York City stations operating on frequencies ranging from 43.1 to 47.5, which were assigned call signs between W31NY and W75NY. In order to eliminate this confusion, the FCC announced that, effective November 1, 1943, the 45 existing commercial FM stations would change to standard call letters. At the same time, the "-FM" suffix was introduced, which meant that FM stations could use the same base call letters as an existing AM station if they added "-FM" to their call. One restriction was that the paired stations had to have common ownership and be in the same community.
- TV and DT: Commercial television was introduced in the United States in July 1941, and initially TV stations were assigned standard unique four-letter call signs. In August 1946 the "-TV" suffix was introduced, which, like "-FM", included the restriction that paired stations had to have the same owners and be in the same community. The "-DT" suffix was introduced as part of the later conversion of TV stations from analog to digital transmissions. During a transition period, digital TV stations were identified using -DT suffixed calls, with the base call staying the same as the one assigned to their analog sister station, e.g., WRC-DT was paired with WRC-TV, etc. With the termination of the analog stations in June 2009, most digital TV stations inherited the calls formerly used by their analog counterparts. However, the FCC provided that these stations could optionally keep their -DT suffix, and a relative few elected to do so, with many more taking advantage of the same window to either add the -TV suffix (as Journal Communications did for all of its previously unsuffixed television stations, including WGBA-TV and WACY-TV), or remove the -TV suffix if there was no longer any associated AM or FM sister station to disambiguate (a direction that WFAA chose to take, with WFAA-TV holding the sole use of those calls since 1983).
- LP: Beginning in 1995, the FCC allowed analog Low Power TV stations to be issued four-letter calls with an "–LP" suffix, although this station classification was largely eliminated with the conversion to mandatory digital TV as of July 14, 2021, with the stations switching from -LP to -LD suffixes. In 2001 Low Power FM stations were also allowed to request -LP suffixed call letters.
- CA, LD, CD and D: In 2000 a new Low Power analog TV classification of Class A television stations was added, with these stations eligible to receive standard call letters with a "-CA" suffix, although this classification was also largely eliminated with the termination of analog TV stations on July 14, 2021, with the stations converted to digital transmissions switching from -CA to -CD suffixes. After the introduction of digital TV, an "-LD" suffix was made available for standard Low Power digital TV stations, with digital Class A TV stations eligible for a "-CD" suffix. Low power digital TV stations, including translators, that still have alphanumeric call signs based on their channel number receive a "–D" suffix, as in W08EG-D. The FCC makes no differentiation between translating and originating LPTV stations, thus either type of station could have an alphanumeric or a regular "-LP" or "-LD" call sign.
- FM Boosters: "Boosters" extend a station's coverage by transmitting on the same channel as an originating station. FM boosters receive call signs which repeat the entire call sign of the primary station, plus a sequential numeric suffix, like "FM1".

Only LPFM boosters have multiple suffixes. The longest possible call sign in the United States (nine characters) went into use for the first time July 22, 2017, when KWSV-LP signed on booster KWSV-LP-FM1.

=== FM and TV translator stations ===
Translators are low-powered transmitters that rebroadcast an originating station's programming on a different channel or frequency. The naming convention for FM translators includes their three-digit FM channel number (from 200 to 300), followed by two sequentially assigned letters – for example, K237FR. The translator may identify itself hourly by voice or Morse code. The primary station may instead choose to identify all its translators together; if it does so, the identification must occur once between 7 a.m. and 9 a.m., once between 12:55 p.m. and 1:05 p.m., and once between 4 p.m. and 6 p.m. local time.

The policy for TV translators consists of a leading geographical letter K or W, followed by the two-digit channel number on which they operate (02-83), and closing with two sequentially assigned letters; for example, W04AX. In 2009, the FCC began allowing digital television stations to apply for "digital replacement" translator stations, which are not given a separate call sign, instead taking on that of the primary station. This is only in the case of areas that would lose coverage due to the digital television transition. As of 2014, channels 7, 9, and 13 in the western United States are up to K07Zx, K09Zx, and K13Zx, respectively. In the digital era, these call signs continue in use with an optional -D suffix to indicate digital operation.

The FCC has since extended K-prefixed translator call signs on channels 7 and 13 to three-letter suffixes; what is now KMNF-LD operated briefly under the six-character call sign K13AAR-D in 2018, and was later granted a channel 7 construction permit with call sign K07AAH-D before changing to its current sign.

== Non-broadcast stations ==
=== Amateur stations ===
Map showing the numeral codes for amateur radio call signs in the United States. The region in which the operator was licensed determines the numeral.

United States amateur radio call signs consist of one or two letters, followed by a single digit, and closing with one to three more letters. The number in the call sign indicates in which of the ten U.S. radio districts the license was issued. (It is no longer necessary for U.S. amateur radio operators to change their call signs after moving into a new district.) Most amateurs going to an exotic location will add a "/location" suffix to show their current operating site, for example, a station visiting American Samoa might sign "(regular call sign)/KH8". American amateurs are permitted to operate in Canada under their own call signs with a location indicator.

Outlying areas have special calls. For example, those issued in Hawaii can (like other American call signs) start with "A", "K", "N", or "W", but then will have "H6" or "H7" before the one to three additional letters. Other Pacific possessions use other "H" numbers. For example, a station on Guam could be "KH2–". Stations in Alaska have "L" as their second prefix letter, and stations in the Caribbean region (such as Puerto Rico and the U.S. Virgin Islands) use "P" for their second letter.

Generally the shorter the call (up to a 1x2 or 2x1 format) the higher the grade of license, but amateurs who upgrade are not required to change their call signs. In any case some of the available blocks have been used up. The 1x1 call signs, such as K6O, are for short-term special event stations. Amateur stations are required to identify themselves by their call sign once every ten minutes during a communication and at the end of the communication.

=== Other services ===
- Experimental stations have alphanumeric call signs, with "X" as the first letter following a regional digit. (All television and most FM stations that were operational before World War II were licensed as experimental stations.) Notable experimental stations included Major Armstrong's FM station W2XMN in Alpine, New Jersey; Powel Crosley Jr.'s 500kW superpower AM W8XO, operating at night carrying WLW's programming; and Don Lee's pioneering television station, W6XAO in Los Angeles. Synchronous AM station "booster" transmitters receive experimental call signs which incorporate the primary stations' call letters in their call signs, for example, WA2XPA was paired with WAPA, and WI2XAC was paired with WIAC.
- Time signal and standard-frequency stations have the reserved call signs WWV, WWVB through WWVI, WWVL, and WWVS. This grouping is derived from shortwave station WWV of Fort Collins, Colorado, which was the U.S. government's first such station. WWVB and WWVH are also currently in use, while WWVL was active from 1962 through 1972. Standard broadcasters may use these call signs with a suffix; what is now WVBX operated as WWVB-FM from 2008 through 2009.
- NOAA Weather Radio stations operating between 162.4 and 162.55 MHz have call signs consisting of a "K" or "W" followed by two letters and two or three digits. The "K" and "W" prefixes are used on both sides of the Mississippi River (for example, KWO35 in New York City and WXK25 in El Paso, Texas).
- Highway advisory radio stations operating on the AM band have call signs consisting of "K" and "W" followed by two or three letters and three digits. As with weather radio, "K" and "W" calls are assigned on both sides of the Mississippi River.
- Leisure craft boats with VHF radios do not have to be assigned call signs, in which case the name of the vessel is used instead. Ships wishing to have a radio license anyway are under FCC class SA: "Ship recreational or voluntarily equipped." Those calls follow the land mobile format of the initial letter K or W followed by one or two letters, followed by three or four numbers (such as KX0983 or WXX0029).
- Military call sign systems:
  - AAA–AEZ and ALA–ALZ are reserved for Department of the Army stations.
  - AFA–AKZ are assigned to the Department of the Air Force.
  - NAA–NZZ is jointly assigned to the Department of the Navy and the U.S. Coast Guard

Call signs in the western United States can be confused with International Civil Aviation Organization (ICAO) airport codes, because they are four-character codes beginning with "K". This may be exploited to help establish local identity. Examples include KSFO (San Francisco International Airport and radio station KSFO), KLAX (Los Angeles International Airport and KLAX-FM), and KDFW (Dallas/Fort Worth International Airport and KDFW (TV)).

== Historical overview ==
=== Early history ===
The use of call letters predates the invention of radio, and were introduced as part of landline telegraph communication. Telegraph operators generally used Morse code, and it was standard practice to assign identifying letters to individual offices located along a line. Early radio stations (originally called "wireless telegraphy") commonly employed former telegraph operators, who continued the practice.

While there was no need for telegraph stations to coordinate their assignments, the great distance that radio signals traveled required international standardization. As early as 1906, the Service Regulations adopted by the Berlin International Wireless Telegraph Convention specified that "calls shall be distinguishable from one another and each must be formed of a group of three letters". Despite this pronouncement, the United States would be slow to adopt this standard, largely because radio stations were unregulated at this time. Individual stations selected their own call signs, commonly only one or two letters, with little concern about duplication. The first U.S. organization to conform to the international standard was the U.S. Navy, which in 1909 switched from two-letter calls scattered throughout the alphabet to three-letter calls, all starting with the letter "N".

The lack of coordination and duplication of call signs used by merchant ships was eventually determined to be a threat to maritime navigation. A November 1911 report by Commissioner of Navigation Eugene Tyler Chamberlain noted the lack of standards in the latest compilation of ship call letters, and decided to take measures to rectify the situation, invoking his authority given "by the act of July 5, 1884" to assign "signal letters to American merchant vessels". (Previously this had applied to four-letter signal flag identifiers).

The new merchant ship radio call letters went into effect on June 30, 1912. Ships were divided into two geographical groups, with three-letter calls starting with "K" assigned to ships on the "Atlantic and Gulf Coasts", and calls starting with "W" assigned to the "Pacific Coast" vessels. No reason was given for splitting the ships into two groups, and this differed from the practice followed for the assignment of the earlier flag signal letters, which had been sequentially issued with no differentiation between the two regions. Nor was any explanation given why the letters "K" and "W" were chosen.

=== Radio Act of 1912 ===
The United States did not license radio stations until the adoption of the Radio Act of 1912. This new statute placed the licensing authority, including issuing call letters to both ship and land stations, under the control of the Bureau of Navigation in the Department of Commerce. At this time the United States also started to participate with international regulations, and one of the first acts was to be formally assigned call letter blocks. The initial assignment allocated all call signs starting with "N" and "W", plus the range KDA-KZZ, for use by the United States. (Initially KAA-KCZ were assigned to Germany, but in 1929 this call letter block was transferred to the United States. AAA-ALZ were added after World War II.)

The policy that had been adopted for ship stations assignments was "W call letters in the west, and K call letters in the east". For land stations, the reverse was now implemented, with western land stations getting K calls, and eastern stations receiving W calls. This policy is still followed for broadcasting stations assignments.

During a short period, land stations were being issued call letters from a sequential block of "K" call letters that had previously been assigned only to ship stations.

"K", "N", and "W" call letters were considered to be international assignments. Initially there were some classes of radio stations which did not qualify for these calls because they were considered to be only of domestic interest. This included the standard amateur radio stations, plus the three classes of "Special Land" stations: Experimental, Technical and Training School, and Special Amateur. The United States was divided into nine "Radio Inspection" districts, and amateur and Special Land stations were issued call signs that started with the district number in which they were located, followed by two letters. The first letter for standard amateur stations came from the range A-W. For Experimental stations, the first letter was "X", a practice that is still followed. "Y" was reserved for Technical and Training School stations, and "Z" for Special Amateurs. More letters were added as the number of stations grew.

Effective October 1, 1928, the amateur and Special Land stations were "internationalized", with stations adding an initial "W" (for continental) or "K" (for territorial) ahead of their call signs' district number. In later years a greater variety of amateur call signs would be added.

=== Early radio broadcasting stations ===
The original radio stations were primarily used for private point-to-point communication. The early 1920s saw the introduction of radio broadcasting, and by the end of 1922 there were over 500 broadcasting stations operating in the United States. Most of the first broadcasting stations received randomly assigned three-letter call signs. However, in early 1922, due to the prospect of all the available three-letter call signs being used up, the government switched to four-letter calls that were sequentially assigned.

Initially two different patterns were employed. In the east, beginning in April 1922 calls were issued in alphabetical order with "A" fixed as the third letter, i.e. WAAB, WAAC, WAAD... WBAB, WBAC... etc. Surviving stations from this era include WBAP (Fort Worth, Texas), WHAS (Louisville, Kentucky) and WTAM (Cleveland). In April 1923 the pattern switched to calls centered on "B", including WBBM (Chicago), WCBM (Baltimore) and WMBD (Peoria, Illinois). In the west, after a small number of KD—four-letter calls were issued, the government switched to KF—, KG—, and KI—calls issued in alphabetical order, including KFQD (Anchorage, Alaska), KGFX (Kalispell, Montana) and KIUL (Garden City, Kansas).

Beginning in the mid-1920s it became the norm for station owners to request call letters of their own choosing. However, in cases where no preference has been stated, the government will make its own assignment.

=== 1983 deregulation ===
In late 1983, the FCC adopted a number of changes that greatly reduced its role in call letter assignments and disputes, including:

- Ended the ban on issuing call letters that are "not in good taste". The FCC noted that any objections could be handled by a complaint through the federal courts.
- Eliminated the requirement that a station seeking to change its call letters had to notify local stations of the pending request. In addition, the FCC would no longer set aside a 30-day period to receive objections and rule if the new calls met FCC standards, because call letter changes were now being authorized as soon as they were received.
- Eliminated the requirement that stations with four-letter calls operating on different services had to be located in "the same or adjoining communities" in order to have the same base call. (The single-community restriction remains in force for three-letter calls). In 1987, the requirement was further relaxed, now allowing common four-letter base call signs to be issued to stations with different owners, although permission had to first be obtained from the current call letter holder.
- Adopted a "first requester" policy for reassignment of relinquished call letters. The previous rule stated that after a call was relinquished, the reassignment would go to the senior broadcaster requesting during the next 15 days.
- Eliminated the rule that relinquished callsigns could not be reassigned to the same community for 180 days.
- Eliminated the requirement that "suitable clearance" had to be obtained in order to receive call letters that were the initials of a current or former president, or a government agency.

== See also ==
- Amateur radio in the United States#Call signs
- Call sign
- City of license – another element of station licensing
- Facility ID – used by the FCC in the United States to distinguish broadcast stations without regard to call sign changes
