= ÆON Mall Kuching Central =

Shopping mall in Kuching, Sarawak, Malaysia

- Location: Kuching, Kuching Division, Sarawak, Malaysia
- Coordinates: 1.527871°N 110.337316°E
- Address: No 88, Lot 3458, Block 10 KCLD, Jalan Datuk Patinggi Ahmad Zaidi Adruce, Kuching, Sarawak, Malaysia
- Opened: 20 April 2018; 8 years ago
- Developer: KTS Holdings Sdn. Bhd.
- Owner: ÆON Co. (M) Bhd.
- Num. of stores: 120+
- Num. of anchor tenants: 1 (AEON Supermarkets)
- Floor area: 560,000 sq ft (52,000 m^{2})
- Floors: 3
- Website: AEON KUCHING CENTRAL

ÆON Mall Kuching Central is a shopping mall in Kuching, Sarawak, Malaysia. Located at Jalan Datuk Patinggi Ahmad Zaidi Adruce, formerly known as Jalan Kereta Api, it was opened in April 2018. It is ÆON Co. (M) Bhd.'s first mall in East Malaysia and 27th overall nationwide.

It has one anchor tenant which is AEON Supermarkets and several mini-anchors among which includes Brands Outlet and Uniqlo.

ÆON Mall Kuching Central has the capacity to house 135 shopping outlets spread out over three floors.

== Retail outlets ==
Aside from its main anchor tenants, ÆON Mall Kuching Central contains a wide variety of well-known international brands. These include fashion names such as Uniqlo, retail stores including Kaison and Toys "R" Us, footwear firms like Skechers, the 100-yen store Daiso, chain stores such as Sasa and Watsons, telecommunications firms such as Digi and Maxis, and the consumer electronics retail store senQ.

In addition, a food court, several cafes and food stalls can be found inside ÆON Mall Kuching Central, including BBQ Chicken Malaysia, The Chicken Rice Shop, Chatime, Kenny Rogers Roasters, Pizza Hut, Secret Recipe, Starbucks, Dunkin' Donuts, Baskin Robbins and Tealive.

== Entertainment ==
The most well-known of entertainment options at ÆON Mall Kuching Central is MBO Cinemas (cancelled), however, it has yet to begin operations. Also among the tenants are K11 Karaoke and children entertainment outlet Molly Fantasy World.

== Location ==
ÆON Mall Kuching Central is situated before the Jalan Tun Ahmad Zaidi Adruce flyover. It also lies next to the Left Maong River (Malay: Sungai Maong Kiri), a tributary to the Sarawak River.

== Gallery ==
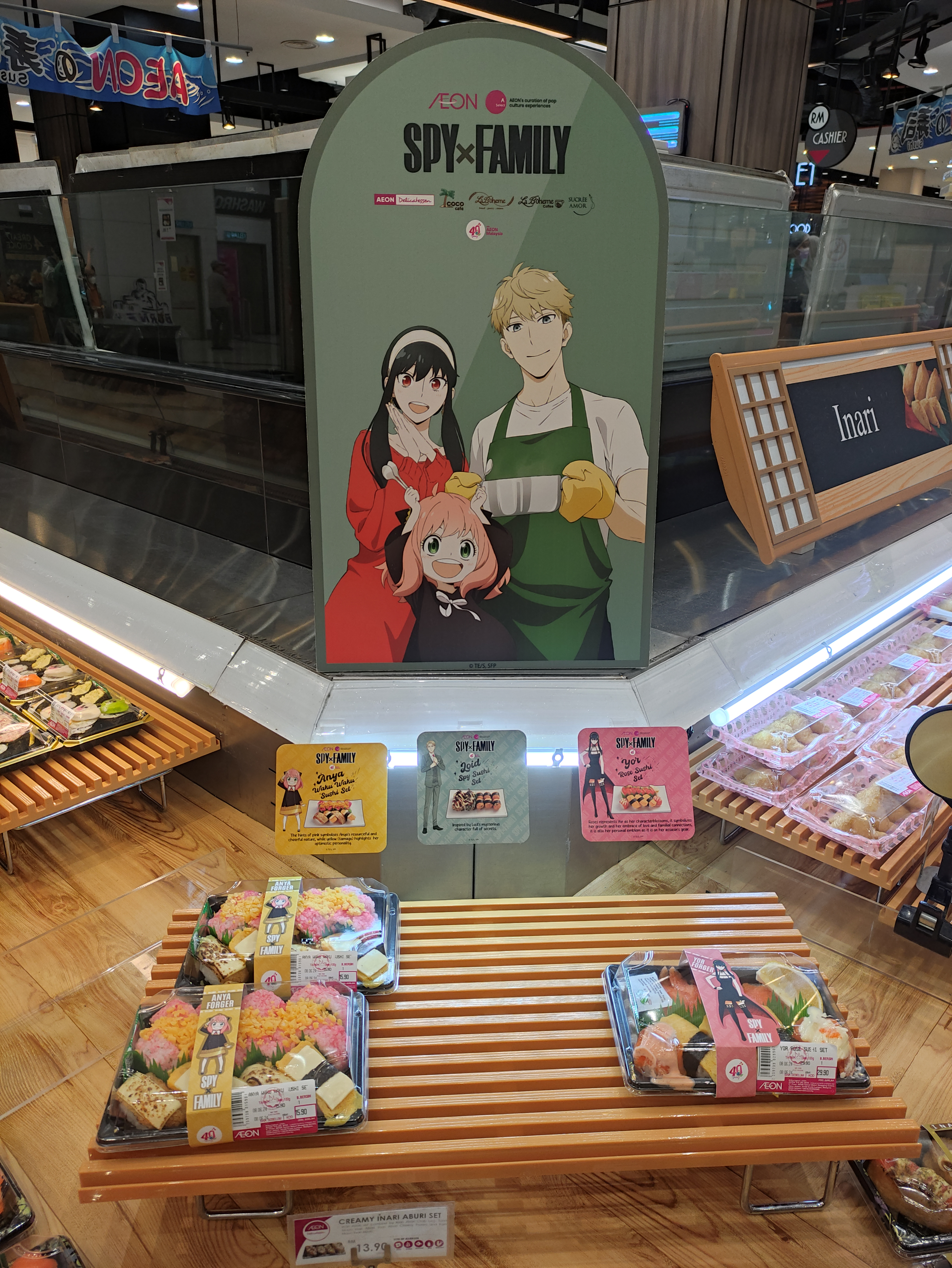
ÆON Mall Kuching Central - Spy x Family sushi collaboration during 2024

== See also ==
- List of shopping malls in Malaysia
