= Jian Goh =

Malaysian Chinese comic artist

- Born: Goh Kheng Swee (吴健瑞); 1985 (age 40–41); Kuching, Sarawak, Malaysia
- Occupations: Comic artist, blogger, illustrator
- Years active: 2007-
- Notable work: Miao & WafuPafu
- Website: www.facebook.com/jian.gohks

Goh Kheng Swee
- Traditional Chinese: 吳健瑞
- Simplified Chinese: 吴健瑞
Transcriptions
Standard Mandarin
- Hanyu Pinyin: Wú Jiànruì

Goh Kheng Swee (吴健瑞, born 1985), who goes by the nicknames Jian Goh and Akiraceo, is a Malaysian Chinese comic artist, blogger and illustrator from Kuching, Sarawak, Malaysia. His notable work is Miao & WafuPafu.

== Early life ==
Jian Goh discovered and developed his drawing skills since childhood. During his school days, apart from reading different types of comic books such as Doraemon, Old Master Q, Detective Conan and Dragon Ball, creating doodles on textbooks, papers or any surface was also his hobby. Before knowing arts could be used in various occupations, such as comic artist, designer or illustrator, he only thought of becoming an architect. Due to the classroom restrictions on talking, Goh preferred to convey messages through passing notes drawings with his classmates, which gradually became a habit of expressing thoughts to others.

== Career ==
=== Creation of Miao & WafuPafu ===
In order to fulfill his father's desire, Jian Goh left Kuching and pursued his studies around the age of 18 for Bachelor's Degree in Electronic Engineering at a peninsula Malaysia university. During his fourth year as an undergraduate, his friend introduced him to blogging, which was also a subject assignment whereby students had to blog for an entire semester. Instead of making expressions through countless texts, most of his blogs were accompanied by illustrations that resembled a comic strip. Later in 2007, Goh created Miao, a male orange tabby cat alter ego cartoon character to blog about his encounters through attached illustrations and some texts, which later developed into a series of blog comic strips. Soon, Miao comic strip was given some positive feedbacks from the blog users. Goh also added his real life two pet hamsters, Wafu and Pafu, into his works, creating the title Miao & WafuPafu. After certain times of posting, Jian Goh decided to shut down the assignment blog and continued his webcomic creations in his own domain, Akiraceo.

After five years studying aboard, Jian Goh worked as a Research and Development optoelectronic engineer in Malacca LED company for the next four years. In 2012, Goh quitted his engineering job and returned to Kuching to achieve his dream of becoming a comic artist. Goh released his first physical comic book, Once Upon a Miao: Stories from the Other Side of Malaysia in 2015 and began its series in the future. Goh also received some illustration requests from World Wildlife Fund Malaysia, ÆON Mall Kuching Central, Taiwan Tourism Administration, Plaza Sungei Wang, AirAsia Malaysia and so on.

== Personal life ==
Jian Goh is the only son in the family. He has two elder sisters and one younger sister. His hobbies are drawing, engineering, cooking, photography, music and others.

== Works ==
- Miao & WafuPafu webcomics
- Once Upon a Miao series
  - Once Upon a Miao: Stories from the Other Side of Malaysia
  - Once Upon a Miao 2: Stories from the Other Side of Malaysia
  - Once Upon a Miao 3: Even More Stories from the Other Side of Malaysia
  - Once Upon a Miao 4: My School Holidays (stylised as Once Upon a Mi4o)

== Nominations ==
- Malaysia Digi WWWOW Awards (2011 finalist).
- Nuffnang Asia-Pacific Blog Awards (2011 best original blog design).
- Singapore Blog Awards Best-What-The-Hell Blog (2011 finalist).
