= Tealive =

Beverage store chain in Malaysia

- Industry: Beverage
- Genre: Bubble tea
- Founded: 2017; 9 years ago
- Founder: Bryan Loo
- Headquarters: Kuala Lumpur, Malaysia
- Area served: Worldwide
- Products: Tea; Bubble tea; Flavored tea; Coffee
- Services: Tea
- Owner: Loob Holding Sdn.Bhd.
- Website: www.tealive.com.my

Tealive is a Malaysian tea beverage chain established in 2017. It is owned by Loob Holding Sdn. Bhd. It was founded as a demerger of the then-existing Malaysian franchise network of Taiwanese company Chatime after long-standing disagreements between both Loob and Chatime over brand royalties and supply chain management. It has since spread as the largest lifestyle tea brand in Southeast Asia with branches in Brunei, the Philippines, Cambodia, Myanmar, and Vietnam. As of 2023, Tealive has over 800 branches throughout Malaysia. Among the items sold at Tealive are pearl milk tea and various flavored teas.

== History ==
In early 2017, La Kaffa International, the parent company of Chatime, decided to terminate its deal with Loob Holdings, the Malaysian food and beverage franchisee of Chatime, due to Chatime Taiwan's disagreement over the business direction of Chatime Malaysia. Two months after losing his Chatime franchise, Loob Holdings CEO Bryan Loo started his own brand, Tealive, on February 17, 2017. The first international Tealive outlet opened in Vietnam in the same year.

=== Establishment ===
The first Tealive branch in Malaysia was opened at Pavilion Kuala Lumpur on February 26, 2017. It was launched by Bryan Loo three months after the closure of 165 Chatime branches in 2016. It also introduced four new menus: Signature Brown Sugar Pearl Milk Tea, Roasted Milk Tea with Handmade Pearls, Signature Passion Fruit Green Tea, and Grapefruit Chia Tea Booster.

=== Expansion ===
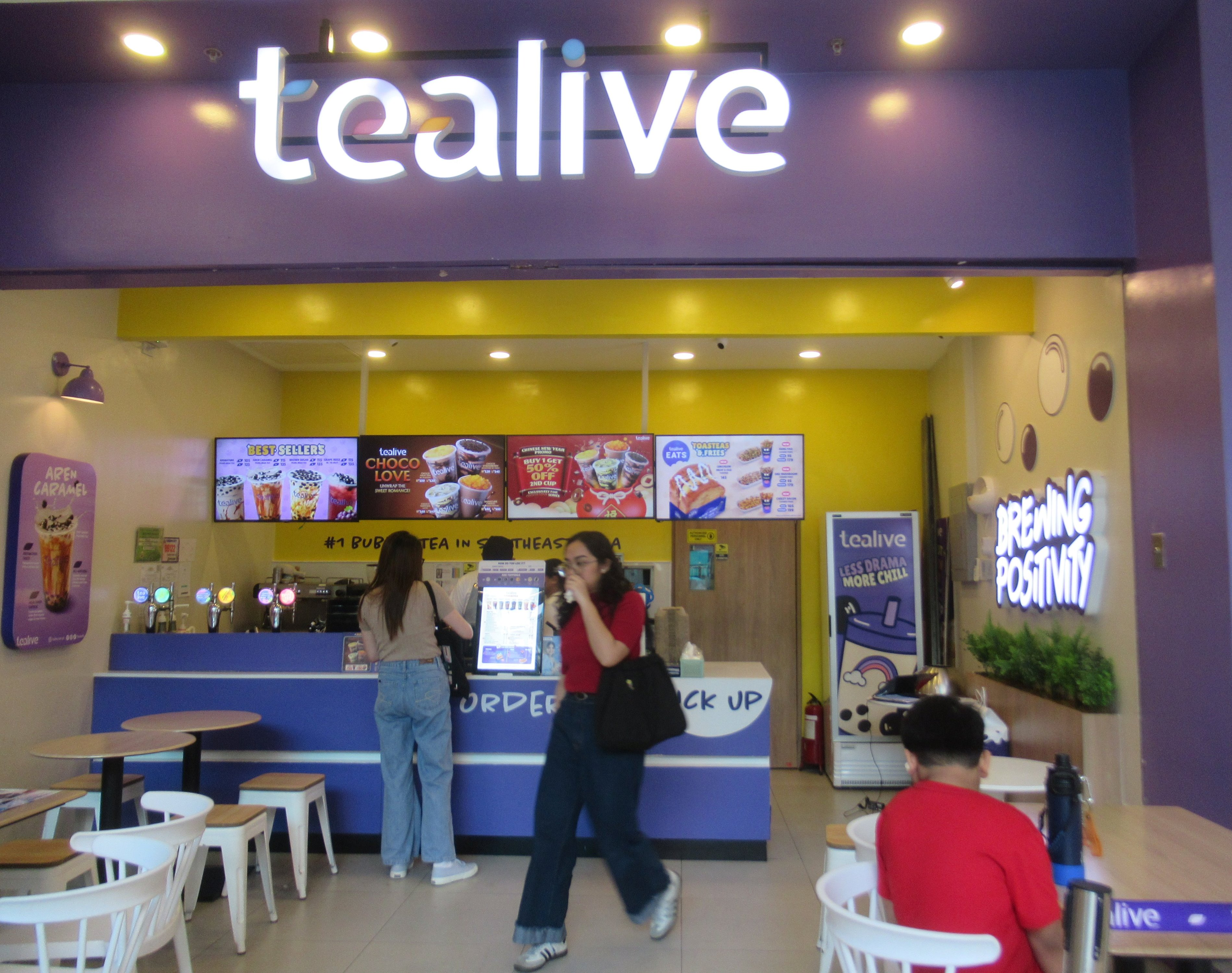
A Tealive store at SM North EDSA, Quezon City, Philippines

On September 25, 2022, Tealive opened its 800th branch in Batu Kawan, Penang, with plans to reach 1000 branches by 2024. In early 2019, Tealive launched its first drive-thru branch in collaboration with Petronas in Subang Jaya, Selangor.

== Incidents ==
On June 27, 2018, the Court of Appeal ordered Tealive, owned by Loob Holdings Sdn Bhd, to close all its operations after being found guilty against Chatime, owned by La Kaffa International Co Ltd from Taiwan. This was because La Kaffa claimed that Tealive had violated the agreement as its franchise and had altered the drink ingredients without La Kaffa's approval as the parent franchise company. However, Tealive did not cease operations and instead settled out-of-court with Chatime, thus ending the legal battle between the two cooperations.

== See also ==
- Chatime
