= Simi Valley Town Center =

Shopping center in Simi Valley, California, United States

- Location: Simi Valley, California, U.S.
- Coordinates: 34.284795°N 118.770070°W
- Address: 1555 Simi Town Center Way
- Opened: 2005
- Manager: Spinoso Real Estate Group
- Owner: Steerpoint Capital and SteelWave
- Num. of stores: 67 (as of 2025)
- Num. of anchor tenants: 0
- Floor area: 627,772 sq ft (58,321.9 m^{2})
- Floors: 1 (2 in both former Macy's stores)
- Website: Official Website

Simi Valley Town Center is an outdoor shopping mall in Simi Valley, California, United States, located off California State Route 118 between First Street and Erringer Road. It is owned by San Mateo, California-based commercial real estate developer SteelWave and Los Angeles-based Steerpoint Capital. The center is managed by Spinoso Real Estate Group.

The center features California Pizza Kitchen, Five Below, Marshalls, Studio Movie Grill, and Ulta Beauty as major tenants. It was last anchored by Macy's, which shuttered its Men's and Home store in 2017 and its main store in 2024.

== History ==
Simi Valley Town Center opened in 2005 with 120 tenants, anchored by Macy's and Robinsons-May. The latter was short-lived as it was converted into a Macy's Men's and Home store on September 9, 2006, as part of the acquisition of Robinsons-May's parent company, The May Department Stores Company, by Federated Department Stores, Inc. (Macy's parent company, which is now Macy's, Inc.) in 2005. The complex was designed by the architectural firm F+A Architects to resemble a hillside Italian village. It was originally owned and operated by Forest City Enterprises.

In 2010, the center was sold to Alberta Development Partners and Walton Street Capital.

The center is home to KWSV-LP, a non-commercial low-power FM radio station known as "99.1 The Ranch" that launched in 2015 with a country music format.

The center is also home of the Skateboarding Hall of Fame Museum.

=== Decline and possible revitalization ===
On January 4, 2017, Macy's announced that it would be closing the Men's and Home store, consolidating those departments with the existing women's store at a later date. The closure is part of a restructuring effort that involves closing 68 stores and eliminating more than 10,000 jobs nationwide.

On September 15, 2017, Apple closed their doors permanently, as it was one of the company's first stores to shutter completely.

On January 18, 2024, it was announced that Macy's would be closing as part of a plan to close 5 stores nationwide, which will leave the mall with no anchors.

In October 2024, the center was purchased by SteelWave and Steerpoint Capital, in hopes in revitalizing the beleaguered shopping center into a mixed-use of residential, dining, entertainment, and retail uses.
