= F+A Architects =

F+A Architects is an architectural firm based in Pasadena, California, and was founded in 1973. It works primarily in the planning and design development of retail stores and shopping malls. Many of the firm's projects are designed and built in North America, but F+A has also worked on large international projects, most notably in Dubai UAE, Qatar, and Jordan.

== North American projects ==
Several of the firm's projects are noted for a simulated Italian village architectural style, a practice that began with the firm's 1998 design of The Commons complex in Calabasas, California. The firm would continue using a neo-Italianate motif in its 2005 design of the Simi Valley Town Center regional mall in Simi Valley, California, which is designed to look like an Italian hillside village. To give the Simi Valley Town Center a more European appearance, the mall was designed with architectural elements such as trellised and covered walkways, gardens, courtyards, arches, and copper domes.

The incorporation of such traditional elements typifies F+A's overall historicist design style. In the 2003 design of the Pike at Rainbow Harbor in Long Beach, California, the firm used numerous shapes, angles, colors, and textures to create a venue that looked like it had always been part of an historical waterfront area. Each building in the complex has a unique footprint, to avoid the uniform "big box store" appearance that is typical of many modern shopping malls.

The firm has also designed several malls around the upscale lifestyle center design concept, which combines retail shopping with other leisure amenities. For example, The Village at Park Royal Shopping Centre in West Vancouver is considered to be Canada's first lifestyle center.

== Middle Eastern projects ==
The firm's most famous design project to date is the Mall of the Emirates in Dubai, which is considered the world's first shopping resort. The design of the mall incorporates both European and Arabic design elements. The firm is currently doing more design work in Dubai, including a motorcycle racetrack, a watersports facility, and a large go-kart racing facility at the Dubailand complex.

== Selected work ==
- Ontario Mills (1996), Ontario, California
- The Commons (1998), Calabasas, California
- Fashion Fair Mall (renovation and additions, 2003) Fresno, California
- Pike at Rainbow Harbor (2003), Long Beach, California
- The Village at Park Royal Shopping Centre (2004), West Vancouver, British Columbia, Canada
- Mall of the Emirates (2005), Dubai, United Arab Emirates
- Simi Valley Town Center (2005), Simi Valley, California
- Landmark Theatres building at Westside Pavilion (2007), Los Angeles, California (with PleskowRael)

== Awards and recognition ==
- International Design & Development Awards, International Council of Shopping Centers (ICSC) in 2000, 2006, 2007.
- Award of Excellence: Commercial/Retail Development, Urban Development Institute-Pacific Region, in 2005.
