= Park Royal Shopping Centre =

Mall in West Vancouver, British Columbia

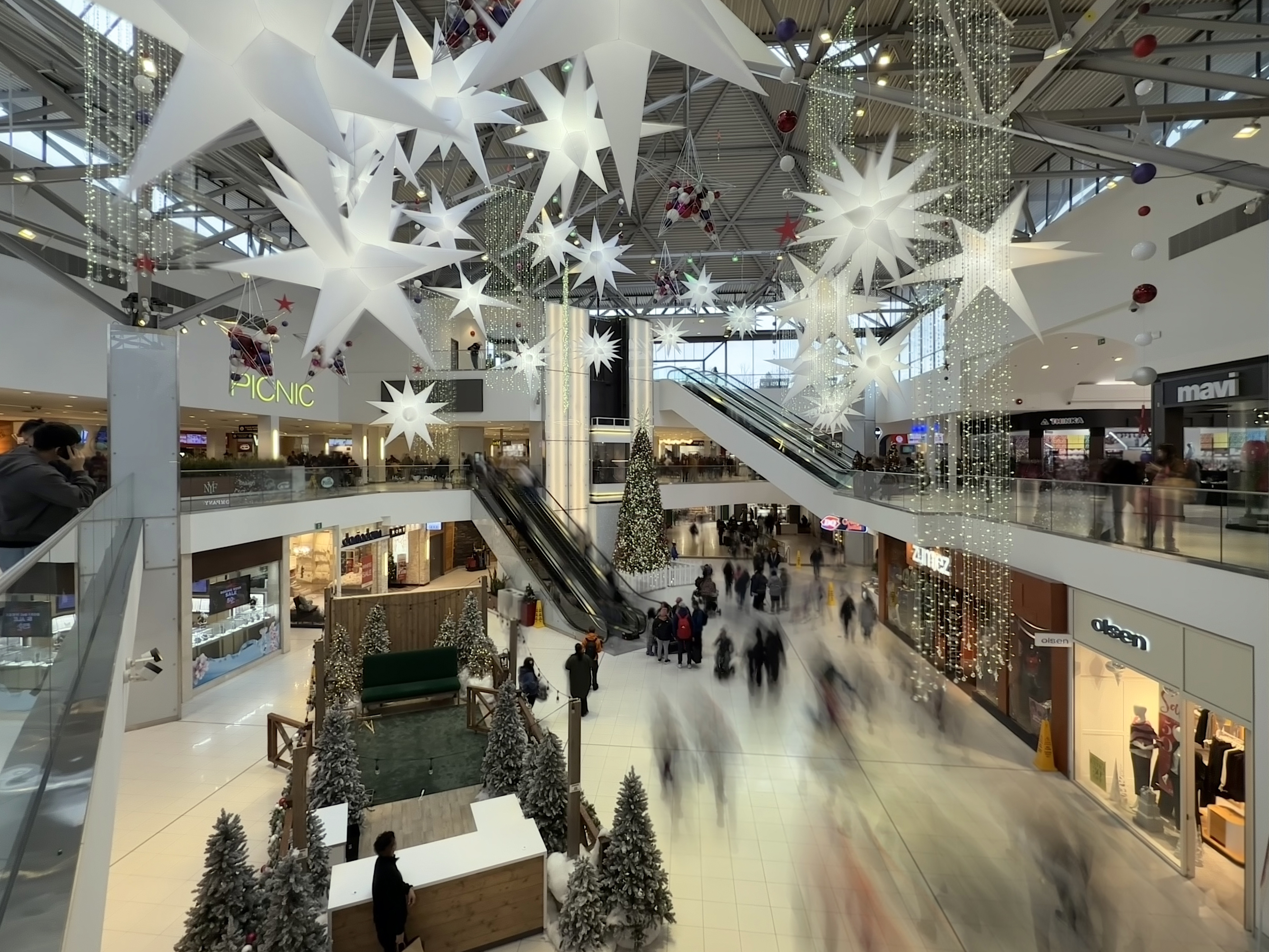
- Atrium of South Wing in 2025
- Location: West Vancouver and X̱wemelch'stn, British Columbia, Canada
- Coordinates: 49.326°N 123.137°W
- Opened: September 1, 1950; 76 years ago
- Num. of stores: 280
- Floor area: 1,400,000 sq ft (130,000 m^{2})
- Floors: 1 (Park Royal North), 2 (Park Royal South)
- Public transit: Park Royal Exchange
- Website: shopparkroyal.com

Park Royal Shopping Centre, also known as simply Park Royal, opened in 1950, is a shopping mall located in West Vancouver and X̱wemelch'stn, British Columbia, Canada. Park Royal was Canada's first covered shopping mall. Park Royal has seen multiple redeveloped projects within the last decade. Notably, in 2014, the district of West Vancouver approved a permit for the "removal of the storefront fabric canopies, faux columns and related 'nautical' theme designs" as well as the re-facing of the building to "create a cohesive look between Park Royal North and Park Royal South." The shopping centre was originally anchored by Woodward's.

== History ==
The Centre was started alongside the Guinness family's British Properties developments nearby, and was named after the London suburb of Park Royal where a Guinness brewery stood. The Guinnesses sold it in 1986.

The mall is physically divided into two locations by Marine Drive, a major thoroughfare on the North Shore. The two sides are aptly named North Mall and South Mall, and are connected by 2 main intersections: Main St - Marine Drive, and Taylor Way - Marine Drive, as well as an overpass next to Shoppers Drug Mart. The North Mall is the original part of the mall, and had the anchor store Woodward's (on the East end) and Woodward's Food Floors (on the West end). Expansion to the South Mall occurred in the 1962 with a further development in the mid-1970s. The expansion in the 1960s added SuperValu and Eaton's as the anchor stores on the South Mall. Further expansion in the mid-1970s added a second floor to the mall and the Hudson's Bay store.

In 1993, when Woodward's closed, The Bay moved into the location previously held by Woodward's. Food Floor was converted into a Government Liquor Store, London Drugs and Rogers Video (now closed).

Park Royal Shopping Centre, prior to the South Mall expansion, c. 1950

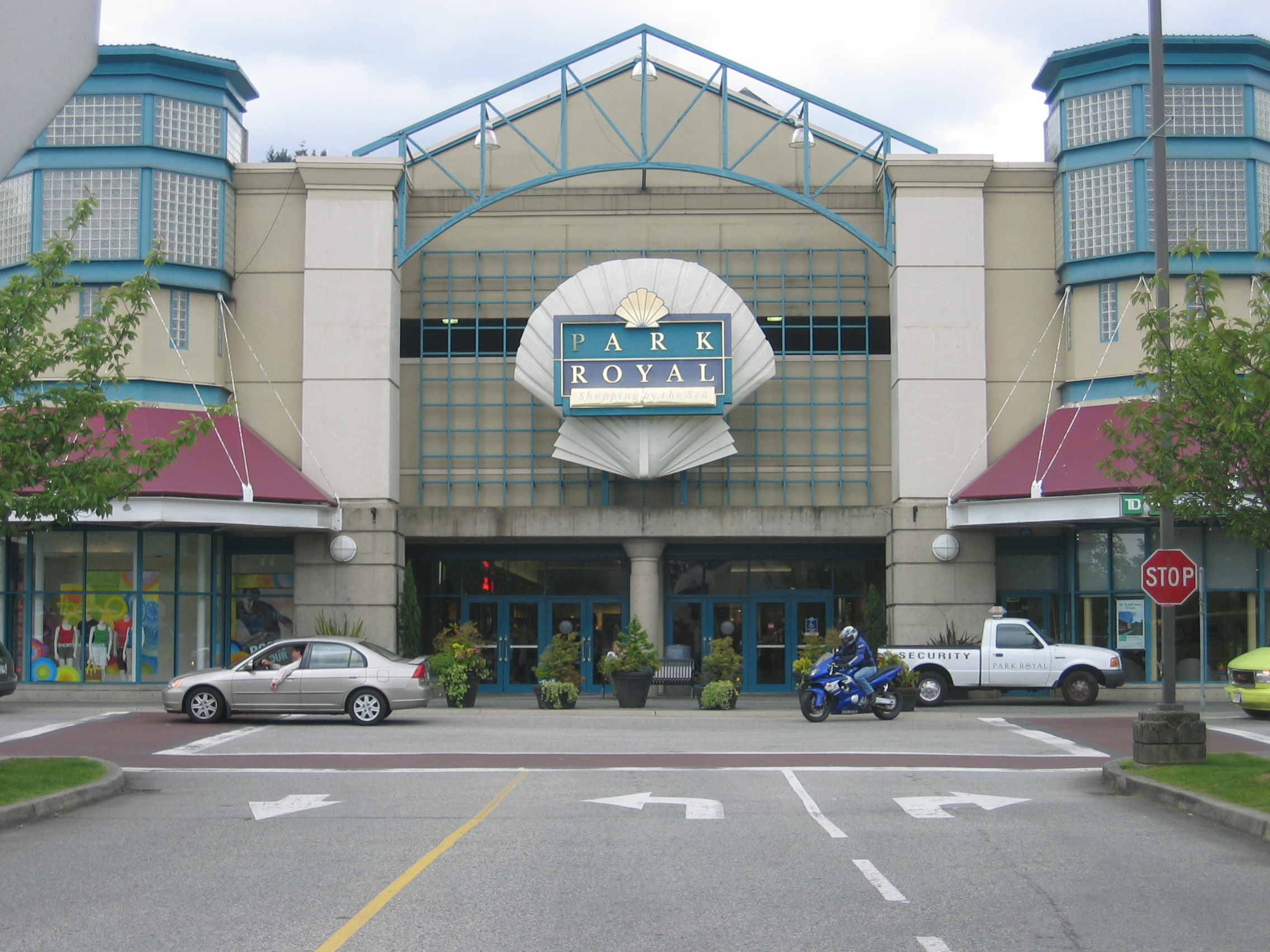
Park Royal North in 2006

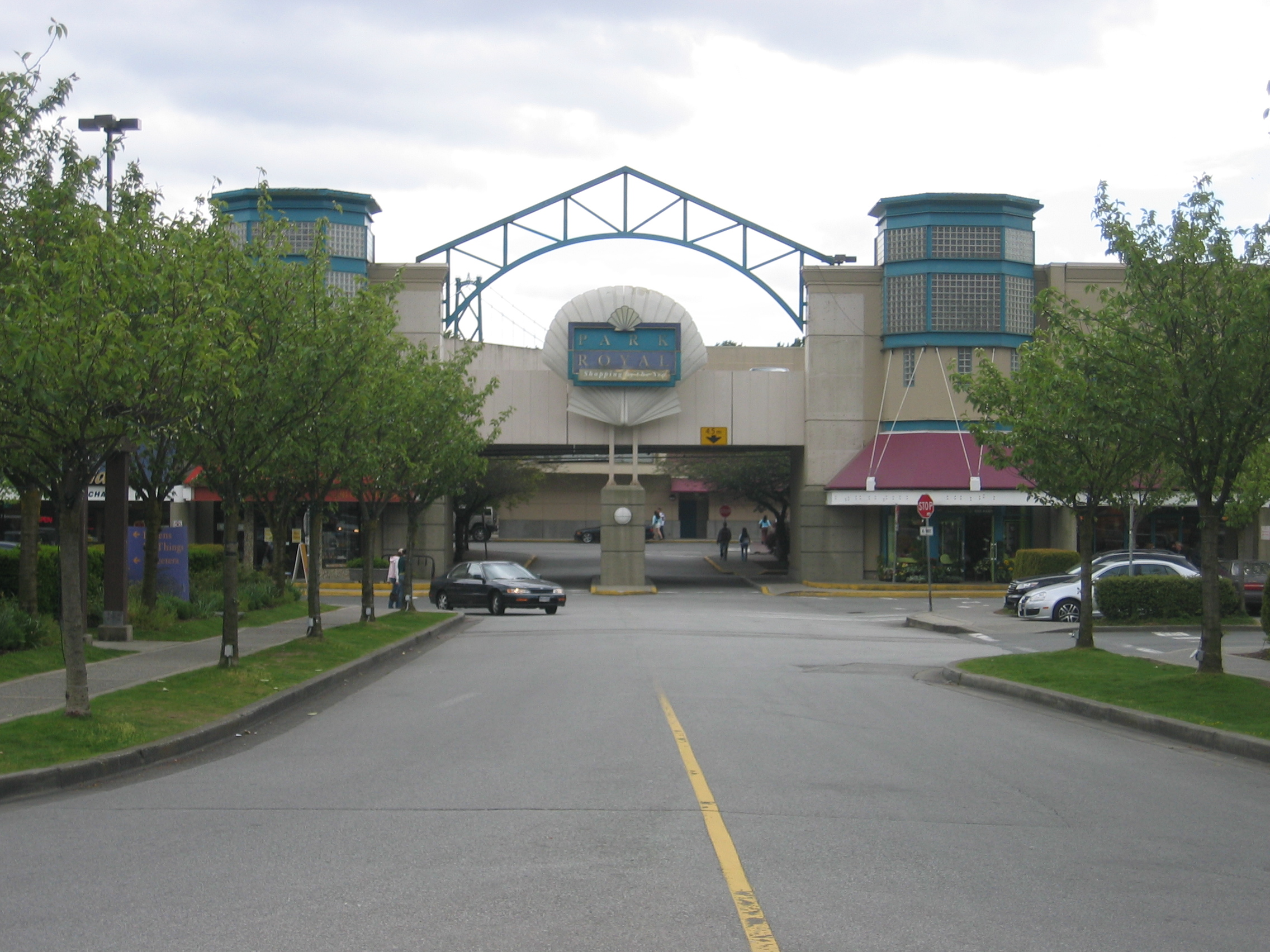
Park Royal South in 2006

== The Village ==
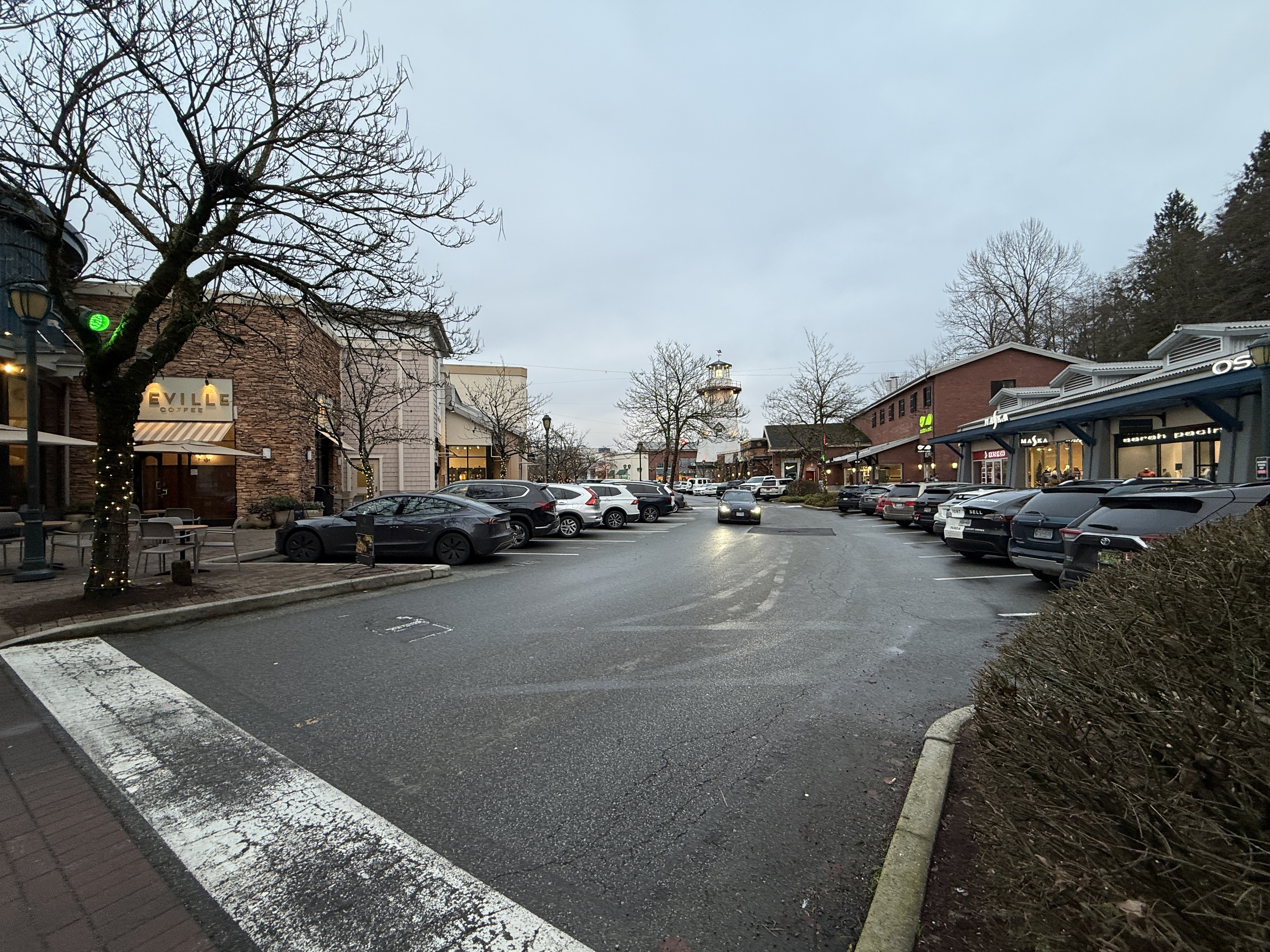
The Village at Park Royal

In late 2004, The Village was opened as an expansion of the South Mall, allowing for more stores and retail services. The Village was designed as a joint venture by the architectural firms, F+A Architects (Pasadena, California) and Musson Cattell Mackey Partnership (Vancouver). The 238,000-square-foot (22,111 m^{2}) expansion cost approximately $30 million Canadian dollars. The Village is Canada's first lifestyle centre specifically designed for the more affluent West Vancouver market, where all the retail locations offer mid to upscale lifestyle services. The Village is unique in that it aims to replicate the experience found at Whistler Village, where consumers are predominantly in the open-air (outside) to browse the stores. A bowling alley and a golf practice range were demolished to make way for The Village.

== Shops and services ==
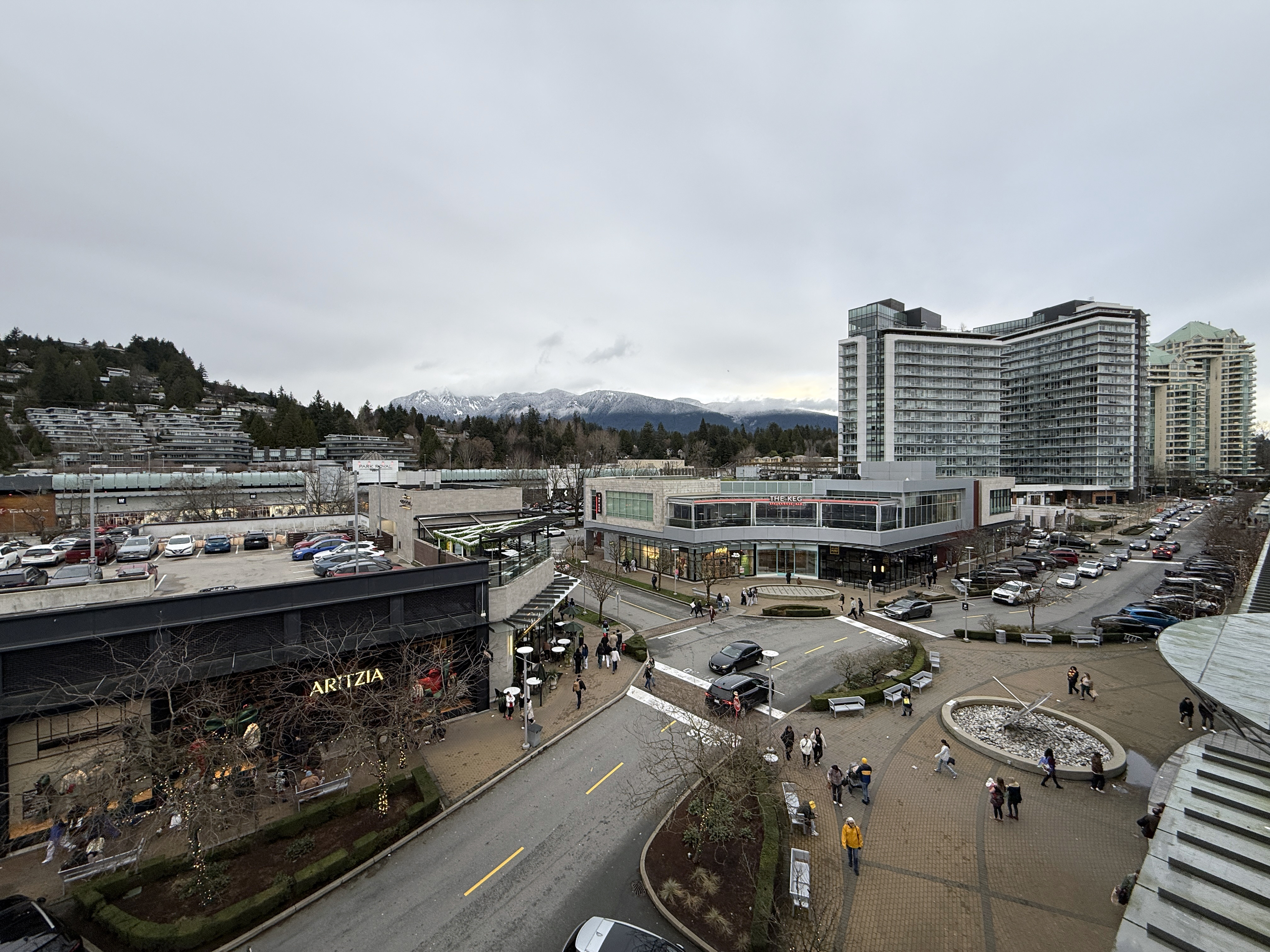
Shops in Main Street

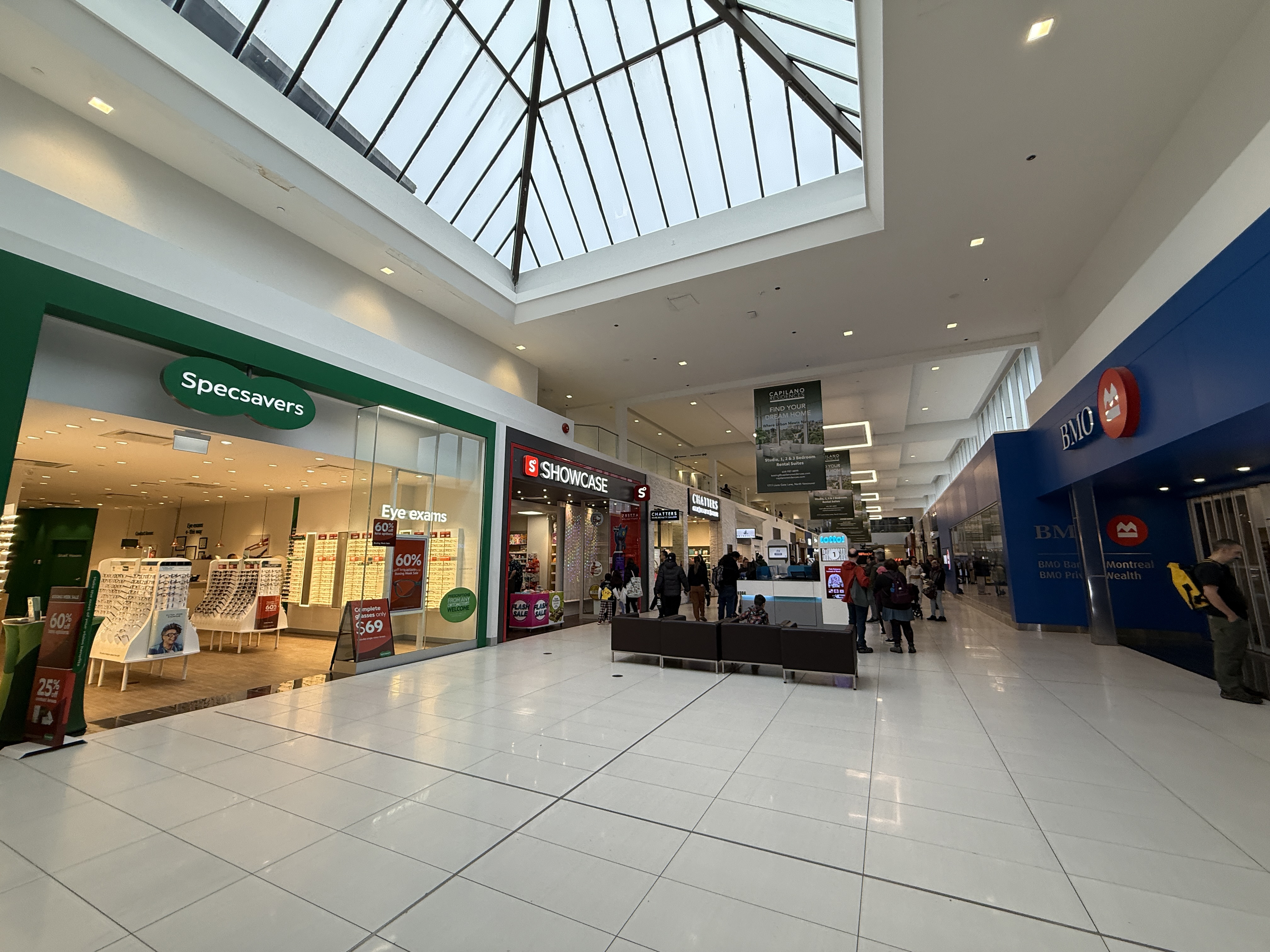
South Wing Ground Level shops

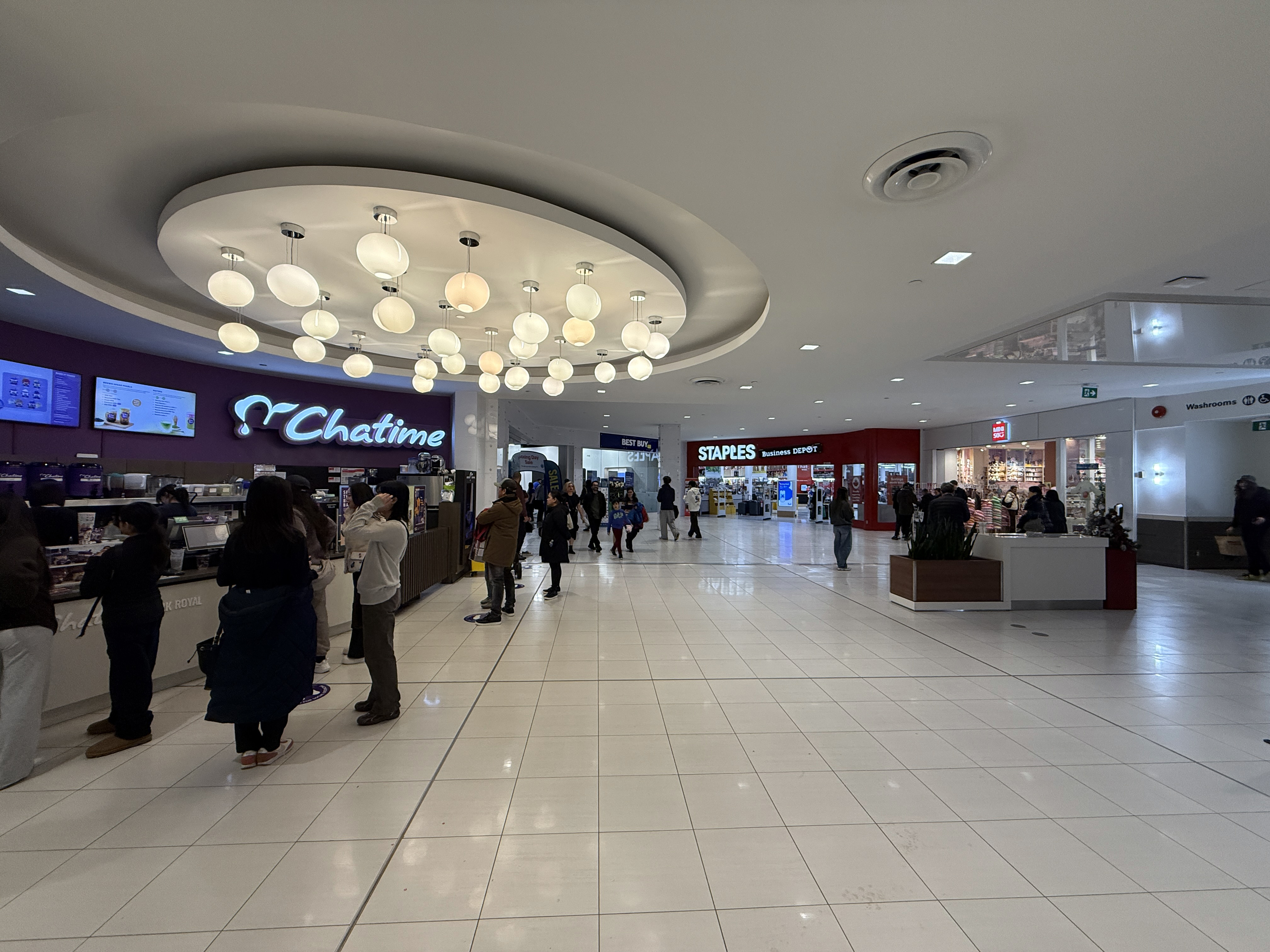
South Wing Level 2 shops

Park Royal South anchor stores include: Best Buy, Staples, La Maison Simons, Sport Chek, and Dollarama. Since 2013, Park Royal has been undergoing major renovations, and has introduced a new village that includes retailers such as: Urban Outfitters, Zara, H&M, Aritzia and Anthropologie. In 2015, Park Royal moved the food court on the south side of the mall to the second floor. It includes chains such as Booster Juice, Freshii, and Chatime. In 2015, Canadian retailer Simons moved into the space that used to be occupied by Extra Foods. In 2017, The Canpets was replaced by a new store, Miniso. A Cineplex VIP movie theatre opened above The Brick on April 3, 2019.

== Transportation ==
Park Royal also acts as a major transit hub, known as the Park Royal Exchange, which is the main transit exchange in West Vancouver. It lies on Marine Drive. Park Royal serves as the western terminus of the R2 Marine Dr RapidBus, as well as housing various other TransLink and West Vancouver Blue Bus bus routes.

== Gallery ==
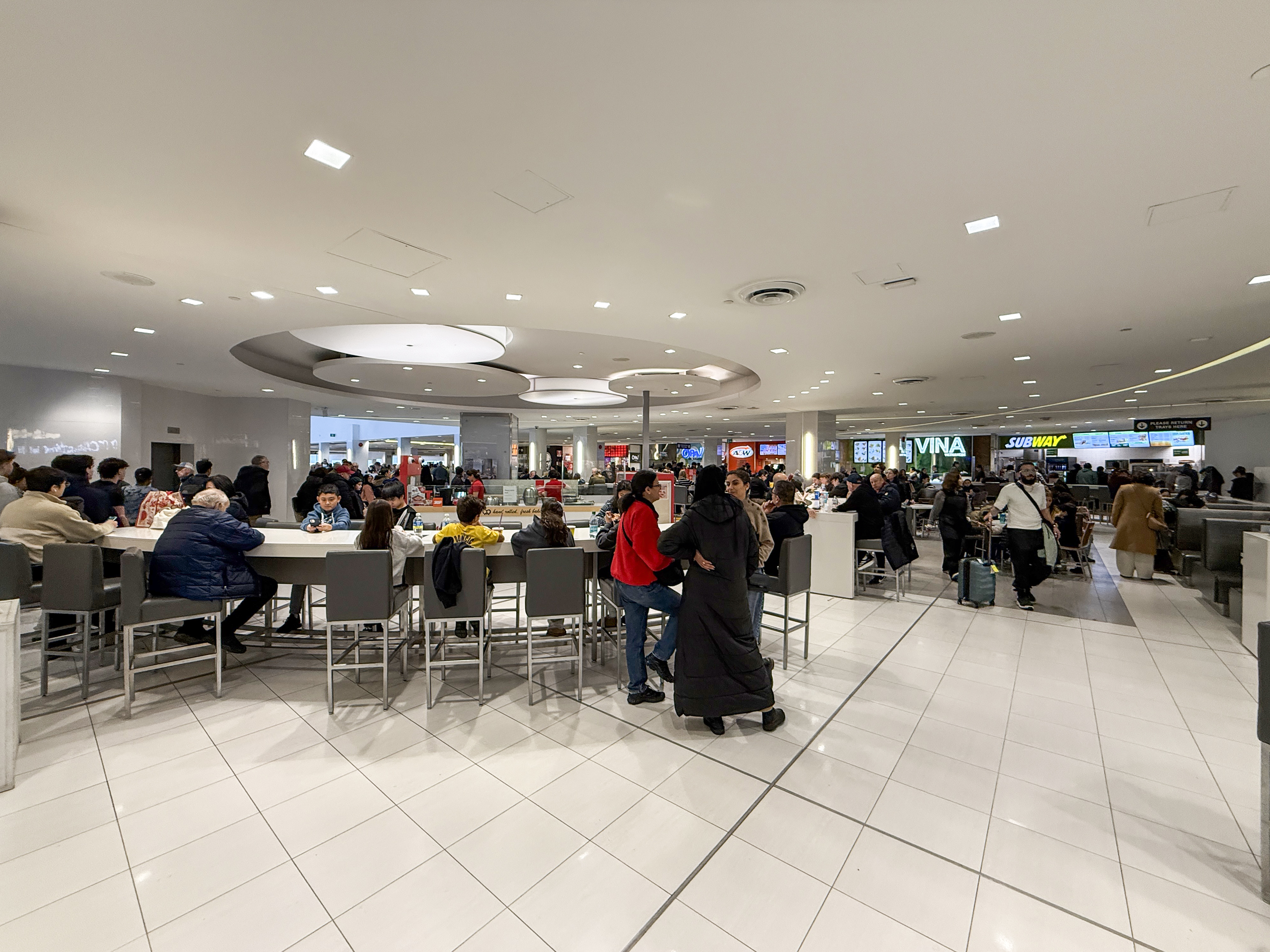
South Wing Level 2 Food Court

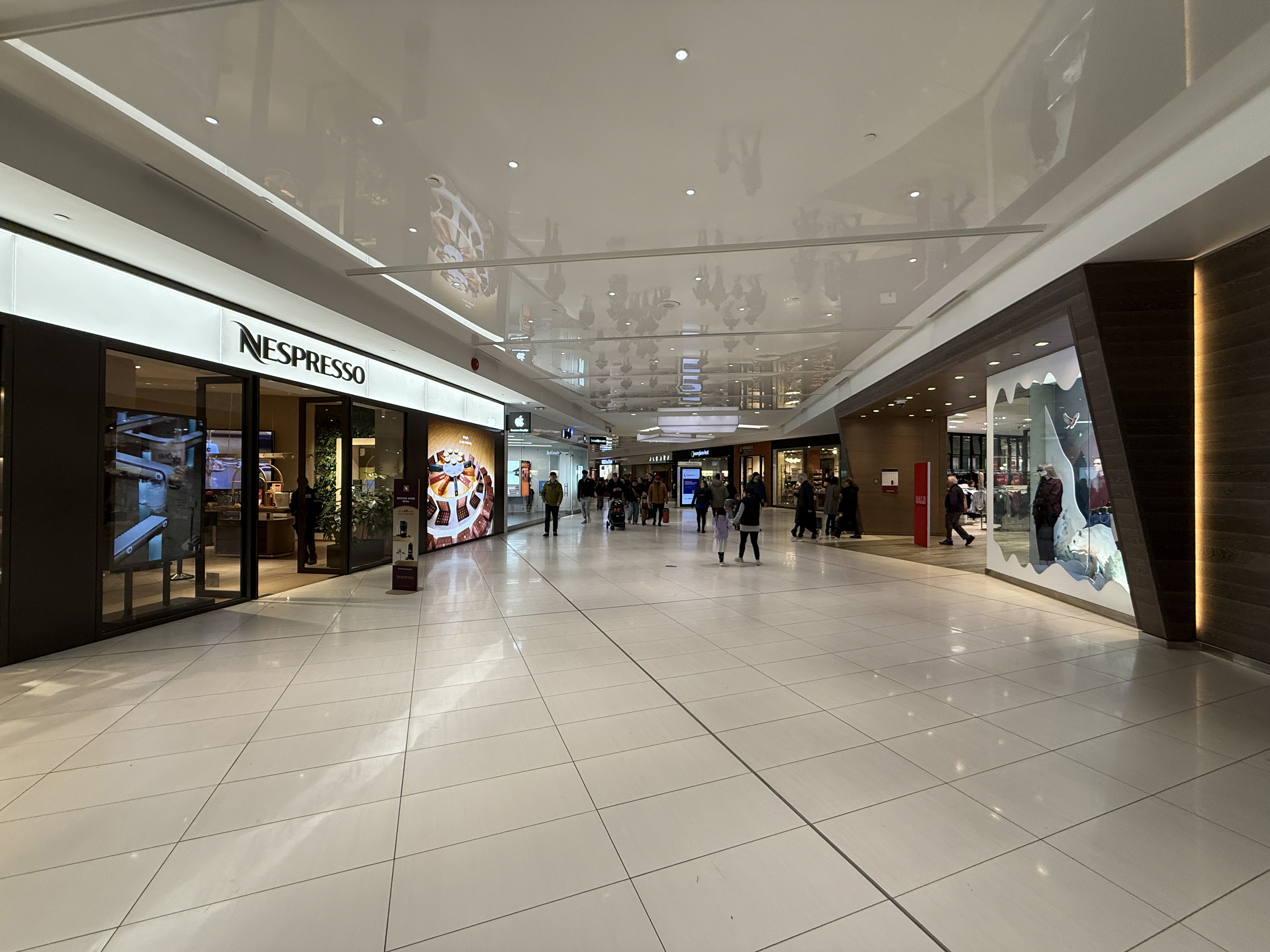
South Wing Ground level expansion area completed in 2015

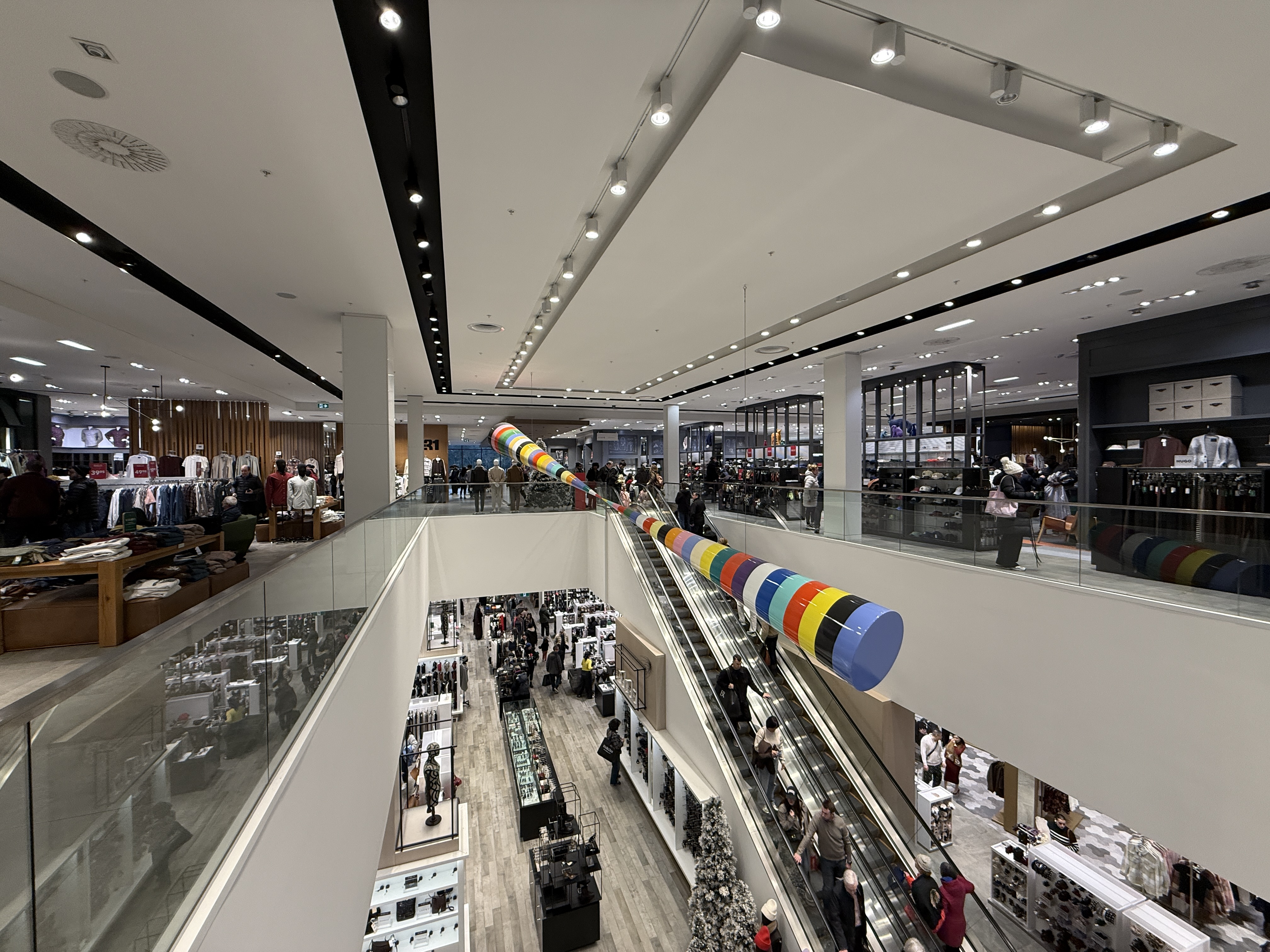
Simons Department Store

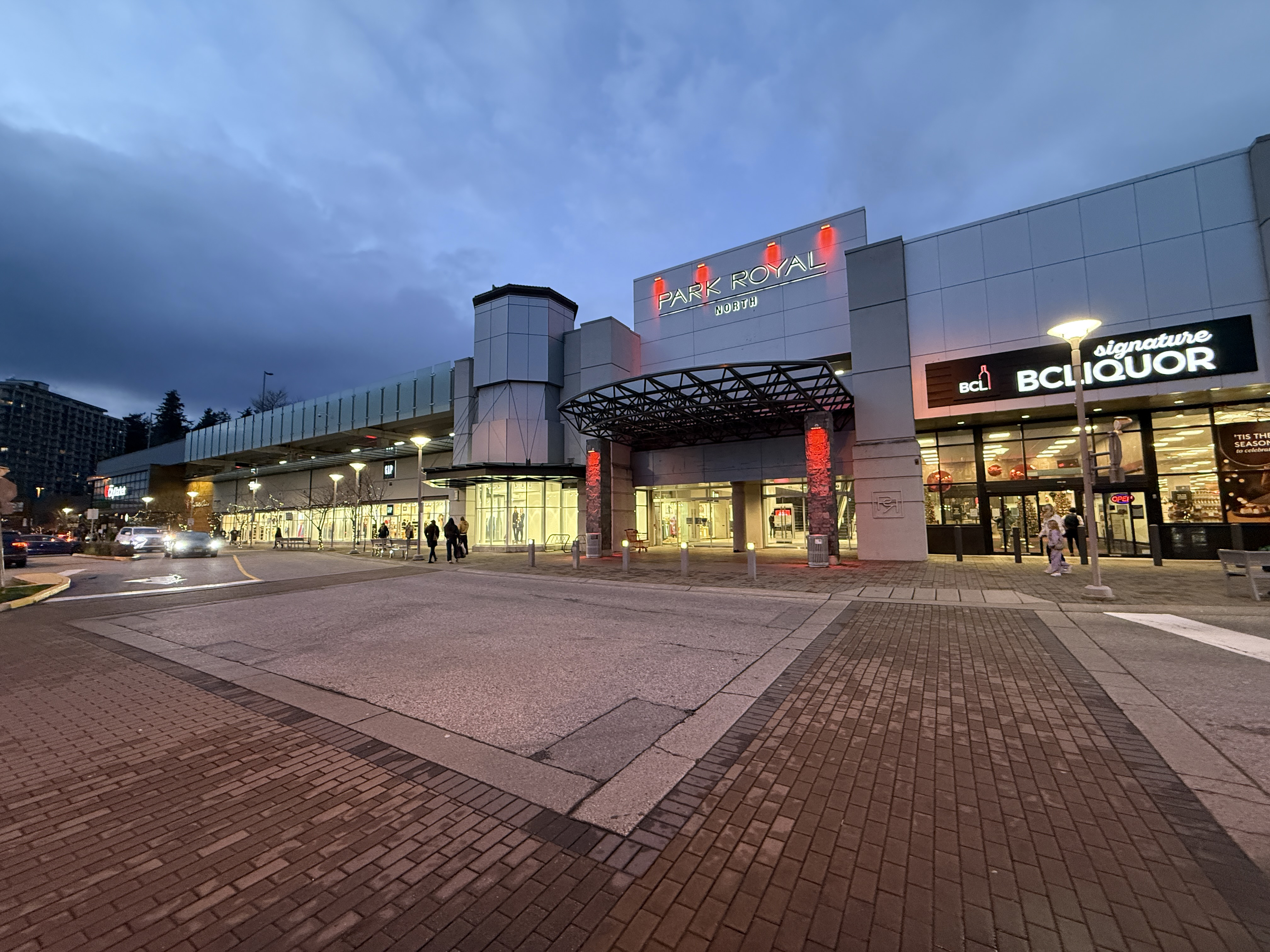
North Wing exterior in 2025

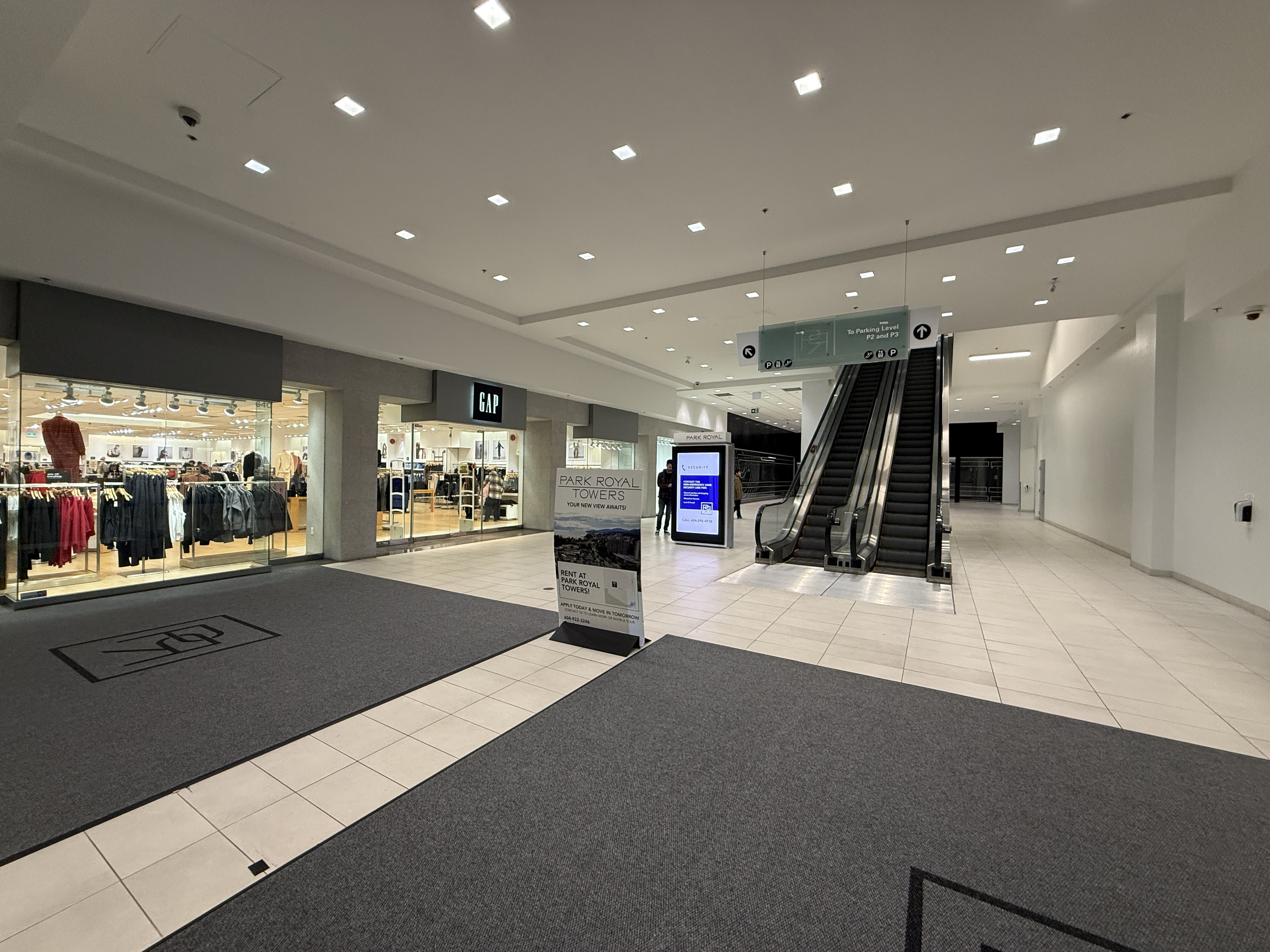
North Wing Ground Level interior

== See also ==
- List of largest shopping malls in Canada
- List of shopping malls in Canada
- Capilano Mall
- Norgate shopping centre - first mall in Canada
