= Senheng Electric =

Malaysian electronics retail chain

- Company type: Public
- Industry: Retail: Computers, Electrical, Electronics and Household Appliances
- Founded: 1989
- Founder: Lim Kim Heng
- Headquarters: Pandan Jaya, Malaysia
- Number of locations: 103
- Key people: Lim Kim Chieng, Co-Founder; Lim Kim Yew, Co-Founder
- Number of employees: Est. 2,000 (Malaysia Only)
- Website: www.senheng.com.my (Senheng MY) www.senq.com.my (senQ Digital Station MY)

Senheng Electric (KL) Sdn Bhd is the largest consumer electronics retail chain store in Malaysia, with over 100 stores nationally. The company sells a range of products including refrigerators, washing machines, televisions, and smartphones, from brands including Samsung, Sharp, and Panasonic.

== History ==
Founded by Lim Kim Heng, Senheng opened its first store on 1 September 1989 with only half-a-store setup located in Pandan Jaya, Kuala Lumpur.

In 1995, the company launched a franchise program that was later discontinued. It was due to lack of management system and the brand “Senheng” wasn't strong enough to make it work at that point of time, thus the franchise program to be put on hold.

On 12 January 1996, Senheng started its nationwide expansion initiative by opening its first outstation outlet in Negeri Sembilan, and then followed by Malacca. Not long after, Senheng set up more outlets across Malaysia and opened its first outlet in Vietnam.

A new franchise program was relaunched in 2001.

In 2002, the company announced a fixed-price policy, ending price-bargaining with customers. The company also began a customer loyalty program and its own credit card.

In 2003, Senheng developed a new retail brand, senQ Digital Station, which focuses on high end and premium electrical and electronic products, and is only located in malls to cater to those with higher purchasing power. The average size of a senQ Digital Station was 20,000 sq ft (1,900 m^{2}), 10 times the size of a Senheng outlet.

The first senQ Digital Station outlet was opened in South City Plaza near Seri Kembangan on 5 December 2003.

Customers can purchase their products from Senheng's website and choose to self-collect or pick up at any of their desired or nearest Senheng or senQ outlets.
