= KWSV-LP =

- Simi Valley, California; United States
- Broadcast area: Eastern Ventura County, San Fernando Valley
- Frequency: 99.1 MHz
- Branding: 99.1 The Ranch

Programming
- Format: Country

Ownership
- Owner: Strategic Communications Group; (Strategic International Ministries)

History
- First air date: March 13, 2015

Technical information
- Licensing authority: FCC
- Facility ID: 197314
- Class: L1
- ERP: 100 watts
- HAAT: 6.1 meters (20 ft)
- Transmitter coordinates: 34°16′55.3″N 118°39′17″W
- Repeater: 99.1 KWSV-LP-FM1 (Chatsworth)

Links
- Public license information: LMS
- Webcast: Listen live
- Website: 991theranch.com

KWSV-LP (99.1 FM, "99.1 The Ranch") is a low-power FM radio station licensed to and serving Simi Valley, California, United States. The station is owned by Strategic Communications Group and broadcasts a country music format from its studios located inside Simi Valley Town Center. It is the flagship station of The Ashley & Brad Show, a syndicated country radio morning program co-hosted by former KZLA and KKGO personality Ashley Paige. KWSV-LP has one booster station, KWSV-LP-FM1 at 99.1 FM in neighboring Chatsworth.

== History ==
The station first signed on on March 13, 2015 as "99.1 The Ranch" with a country music format. Since August 26, 2016, the station has also broadcast high school football games involving local teams under the banner of Ranch Friday Night Lights Game of the Week.

KWSV-LP is the originating station of The Ashley & Brad Show, a nationally syndicated weekday morning program targeted to listeners of country radio. The four-hour show is co-hosted by Ashley Paige, former on-air personality at Los Angeles country outlets KZLA and KKGO, and Brad Abrell, known for his work with WMMO in Orlando and WZTA in Miami.

KWSV-LP is the first low-power FM station in the United States to operate a booster station. In June 2017, the Federal Communications Commission granted the station a construction permit for a six-watt booster to improve reception in the San Fernando Valley. KWSV-LP-FM1, licensed to Chatsworth, California, signed on July 22, 2017, with a signal covering the northwest corner of the valley, an area served weakly by the primary signal. Boosters are used to fill in terrain-related gaps in signal coverage but not to extend coverage beyond the main station's signal contour. The call sign of the booster station is currently the longest call sign in United States broadcasting, at 9 characters.
