= Park Royal Exchange =

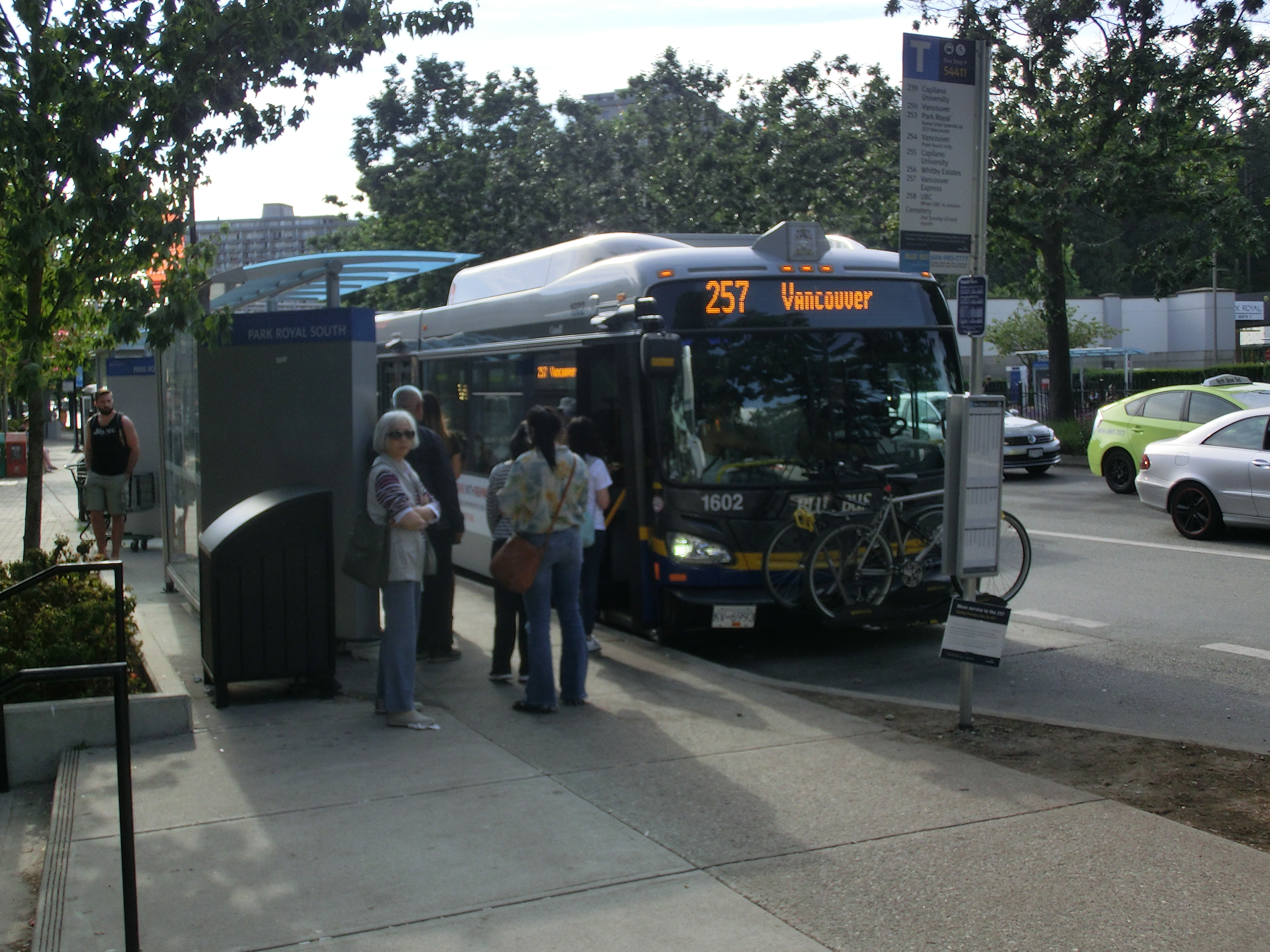

General information
- Location: Park Royal Shopping Centre; West Vancouver, British Columbia; Canada
- Coordinates: 49°19′36″N 123°8′25″W
- Operator: West Vancouver Blue Bus; Coast Mountain Bus Company
- Bus routes: 11
- Bus stands: 8
- Connections: R2 Marine–Willingdon

Other information
- Fare zone: 2

History
- Opened: October 16, 1959
Location

Park Royal Exchange is an on-street transit exchange in West Vancouver, British Columbia, Canada. Opened on October 16, 1959, it lies on Marine Drive at the Park Royal Shopping Centre and has connections to the Horseshoe Bay Ferry Terminal, the City and District of North Vancouver (including Capilano University), and Vancouver.

== Routes ==
| Stop Number | Route | Destination | Notes |
|---|---|---|---|
| 54411 | R2 | Metrotown station | RapidBus service |
| 54411 | 44 | UBC | Only when UBC is in session, AM peak only |
| 54411 | 255 | Capilano University via Lower Lonsdale | |
| 54411 | 250, 253, 254, 257 | Vancouver | |
| 54441 | 44 | Dundarave | Only when UBC is in session, PM peak only |
| 54441 | 250 | Horseshoe Bay | |
| 54441 | 250A | Dundarave | To Marine and 25th |
| 54441 | 251 | Queens | |
| 54441 | 252 | Inglewood | |
| 54441 | 255 | Dundarave | |
| 54441 | 256 | Whitby Estates | |
| 54441 | 257 | Horseshoe Bay Express | |
| 54442 | 256 | | Layover only |
| 54608 | 253 | Caulfeild | |
| 61769 | 254 | | Layover only |
| 61772 | R2, 254 | | Unloading only |
| 61776 | 254 | | Layover only |
| 61782 | 254 | British Properties | |
| 61782 | 256 | Spuraway | |
