= Chatime =

Taiwan-based franchise teahouse chain

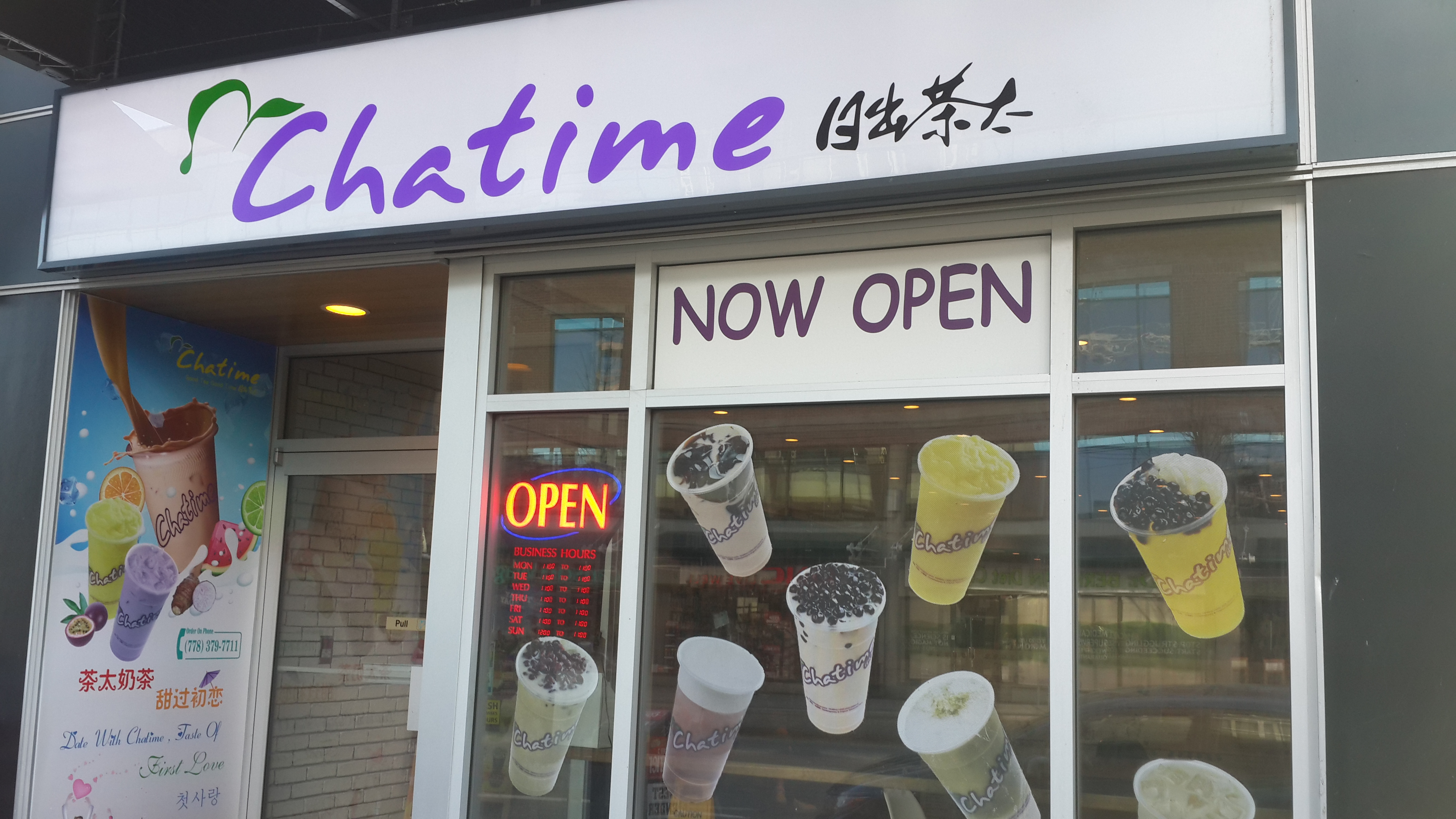
- Native name: 日出茶太
- Industry: Beverages Franchising
- Genre: Bubble tea
- Founded: 2005; 21 years ago in Zhubei, Hsinchu County, Taiwan; opened 2006
- Headquarters: Zhubei, Hsinchu County, Taiwan
- Number of locations: 2400
- Area served: Worldwide
- Key people: Henry Wang (Chairperson, Founder); Kion Zhouling (Vice-president, Co-Founder)
- Products: Bubble tea • Tea • Flavored tea
- Services: Tea
- Revenue: US$138 million
- Operating income: US$4.3 million
- Net income: US$1.56 million
- Number of employees: 2500
- Website: chatime.com.tw/zh chatime.com.tw/en

Chatime (Chinese: 日出茶太; pinyin: Rìchūchátài; Pe̍h-ōe-jī: Ji̍t-chhut Tê-thài) is a Taiwanese global franchise teahouse chain based in Zhubei. Chatime is the largest teahouse franchise in the world. Its expansion and growth model is through franchising. It operates 2500+ outlets in 38 countries. In 2006, it opened its first store outside of Taiwan in California, United States and it has since expanded to China, Malaysia, Mauritius, Canada, Bangladesh, Indonesia, Philippines, Cambodia, Thailand, United Kingdom, United States, Netherlands, Australia, New Zealand, Maldives, India, Ireland, United Arab Emirates, Japan, Mongolia, Lebanon and South Korea, Switzerland among others now.

Its parent company, interlanguage link La Kaffa International Co Ltd 六角國際集團, debuted on the Emerging Stock Market (Chinese: 興櫃市場; Pe̍h-ōe-jī: Hèng-kūi Chhī-tiûⁿ) in December 2012 at NT$168 per share.

== History ==
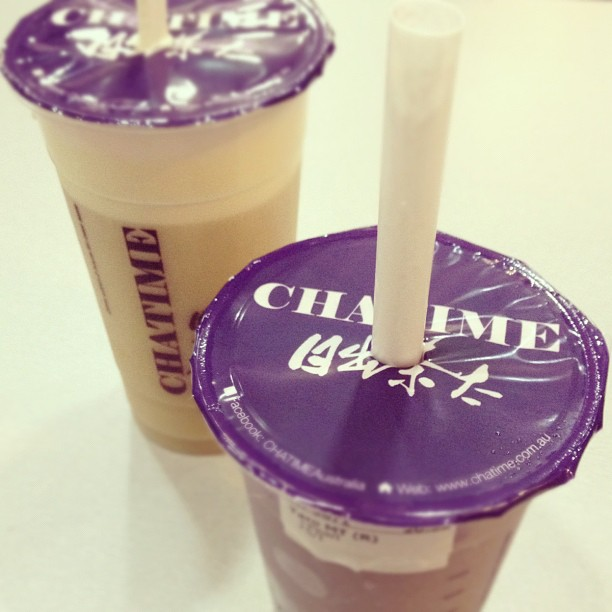
Chatime tea.

Henry Wang founded Chatime in 2005 in Hsinchu, Taiwan, under the parent company, La Kaffa Coffee.

=== Expansion ===
The company opened its first outlet outside of Taiwan in California in 2006, followed by Australia in 2009, where it currently has over 70 stores. This was followed by Malaysia in 2010. Its Malaysian operations currently account for just under 50% of its global revenue.

After its two stores in New York, its third store in the United States opened at Mall of America in March 2012. The Chatime store in London is located on Old Compton Street.

In the Philippines, it planned to open 50 stores by 2014, while in Malaysia, it opened its 100th store in 2013, with plans to open up to 250 stores within a three to five-year period.

As of May 2024, the brand has 5 locations throughout Vancouver, BC and 2 locations in Halifax, NS, Canada, as well as one in Richmond Hill, ON. Sydney, NS also has one as of January 2020. There are 16 locations in Toronto, ON alone in July 2021. There are also locations in Fredericton, New Brunswick and Moncton, New Brunswick.

Chatime has stores in Dhaka and Chittagong in Bangladesh.

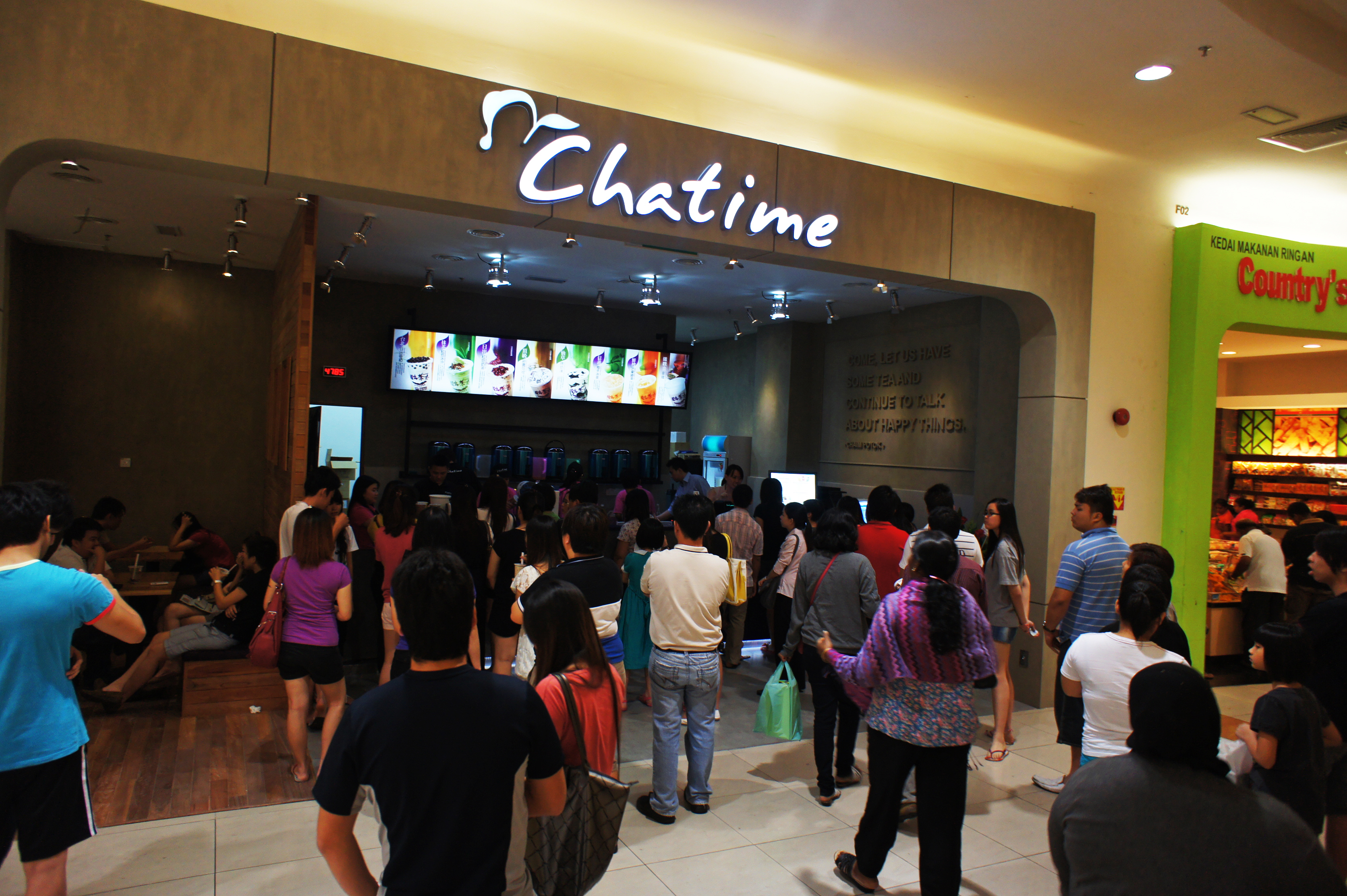
Chatime outlet in Æon, Bandar Bukit Tinggi, Klang, Malaysia

Chatime's parent company, La Kaffa International Co. Ltd., debuted on Taiwan's Emerging Stock Market (興櫃市場) in December 2012 at NT$168 per share under the stock code 2732.

== Products ==
The brand's best-selling drink is its Chatime "pearl" milk tea. The brand has a variety of drinks under categories such as milk tea, fresh tea, fruit tea, "oriental pop tea", "QQ" jelly (Not available in Australia), "mousse", juices, smoothies and coffee. Its products are available with less sugar.

Typically, Chatime products come with a variety of toppings such as "pearls", while "QQ" jelly is a mixture of "pearls" and nata de coco.

Some products are only available in certain countries. For example, in Malaysia, Chatime introduced three flavours in collaboration with Horlicks from GlaxoSmithKline.

== Locations ==
As of 2026, Chatime is present in 64 countries and territories.

=== America ===
- Canada
- United States
- Mexico
- Colombia

=== Europe ===
- United Kingdom
- Ireland
- France
- Germany
- Czech Republic
- Iceland
- Lithuania
- Netherlands
- Finland
- Sweden
- Bulgaria
- Switzerland

=== Middle East ===
- United Arab Emirates
- Kuwait
- Qatar
- Lebanon
- Saudi Arabia
- Iraq

=== Africa ===
- Mauritius
- South Africa (most recently)

=== Oceania ===
- Australia
- Guam
- New Zealand
- Palau
- Fiji

=== Asia ===
- Bangladesh
- Bhutan (most recently)
- Brunei
- Cambodia
- China
- Hong Kong (China)
- India
- Indonesia
- Japan
- Macau (China)
- Malaysia
- Maldives
- Pakistan
- Philippines
- South Korea
- Taiwan
- Vietnam
- Nepal

== Collaborations ==
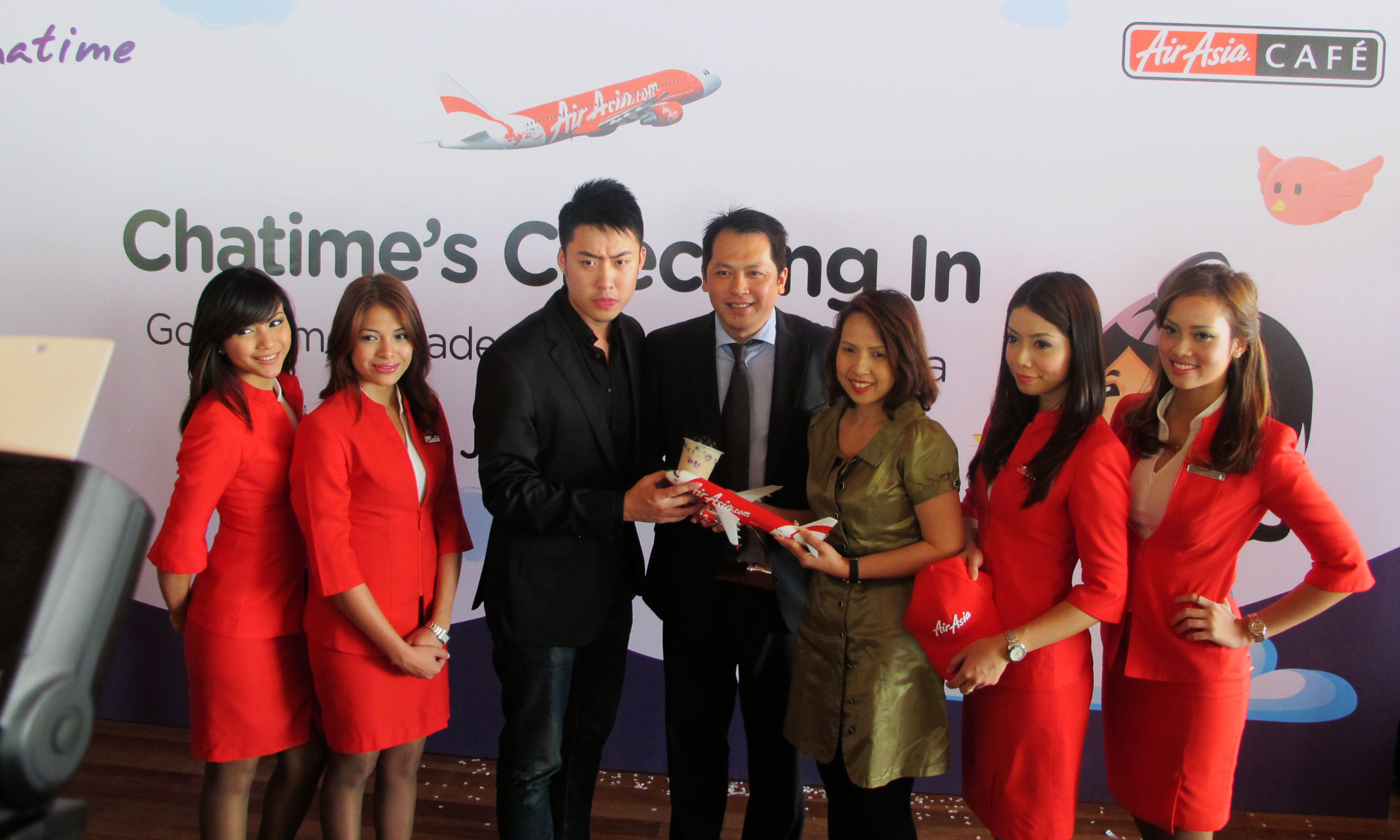
Chatime was the first bubble tea brand to be made available in-flight in a collaboration with AirAsia

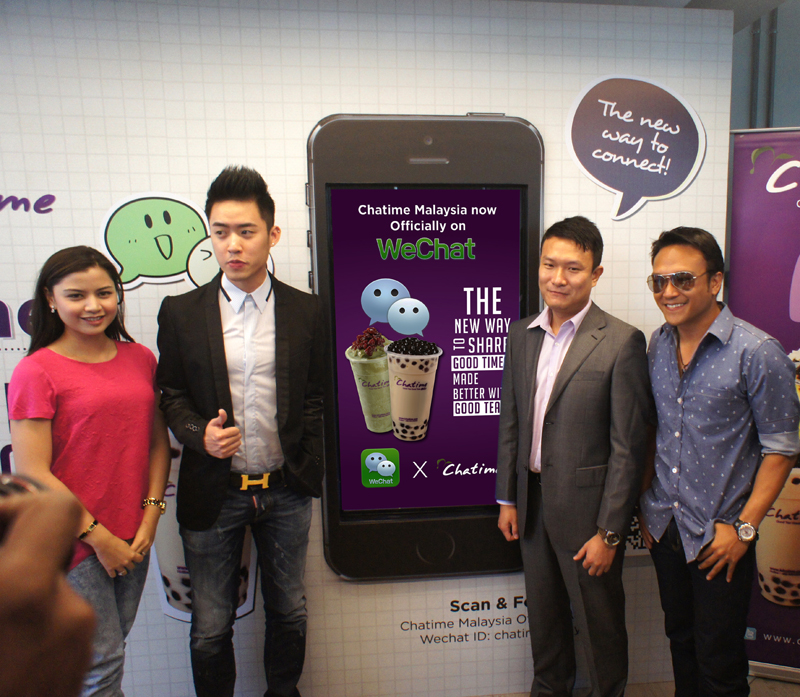
Chatime became the first beverage company in Malaysia to host an official account on WeChat. On the far left and right are WeChat ambassadors Lisa Surihani and Shaheizy Sam.

In 2012, AirAsia announced that it would offer Chatime on its flights and claimed that is would be the "world's first and only in-flight bubble tea". The airline said that two speciality bubble tea drinks, Roasted Milk Tea with Red Bean and Mango Green Tea with Rainbow Jelly, were available on flights operated by Malaysian AirAsia with the airline code AK to 48 destinations, which include India, Hong Kong, Thailand and the Philippines. The collaboration was organised by the then Chatime Malaysia's CEO, Bryan Loo.

Chatime became the first beverage company in Malaysia to host an official account on WeChat. To mark the collaboration, Chatime gave away 1 million cups of drinks worth over RM6 million/US$2 million through digital coupons made available via the WeChat platform.

Other collaborations include partnerships with McDonald's, BT21, Horlicks from GlaxoSmithKline, and biscuit brand Julie's.

== Brand ambassadors ==
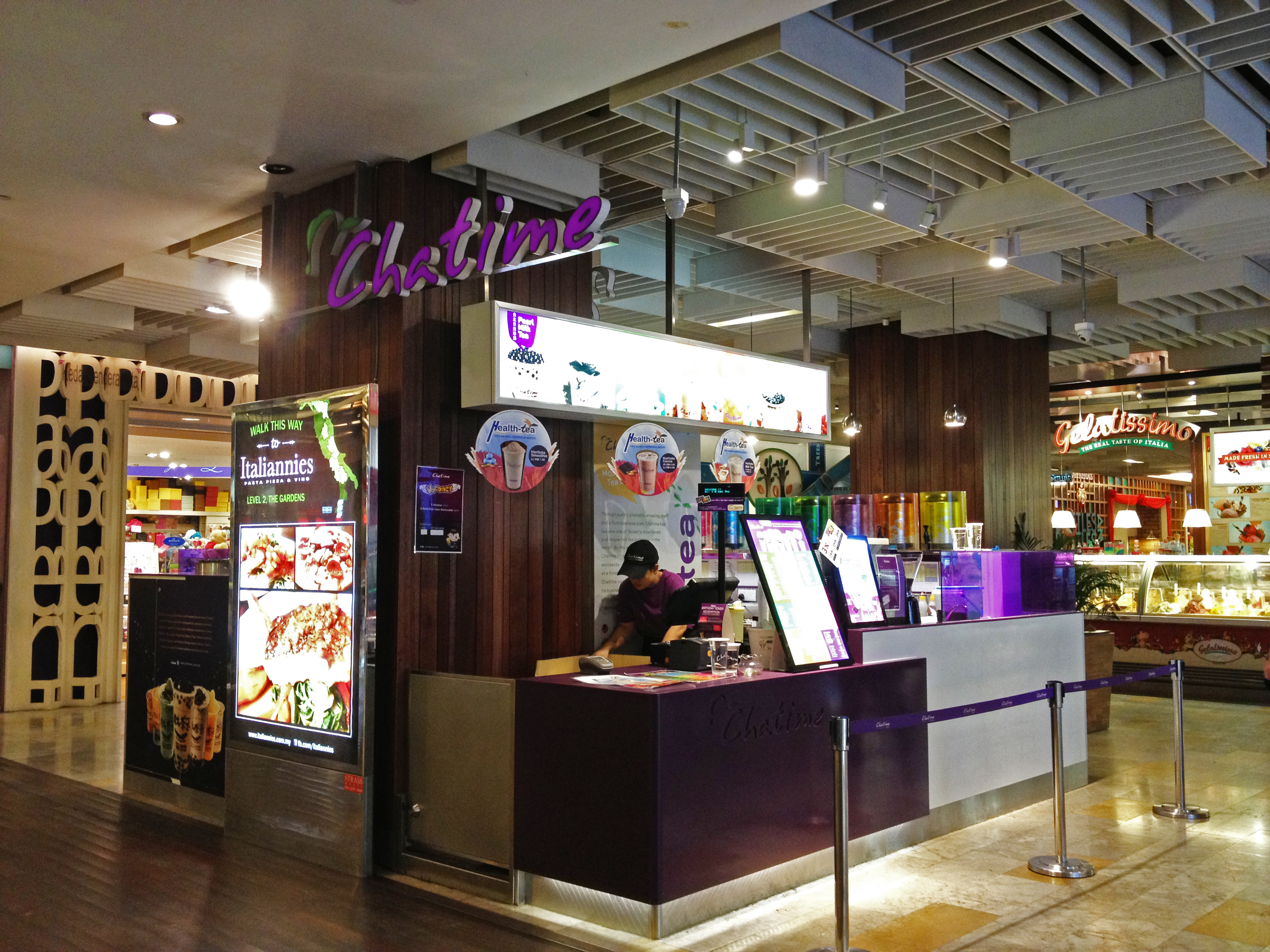
A Chatime outlet in a shopping mall

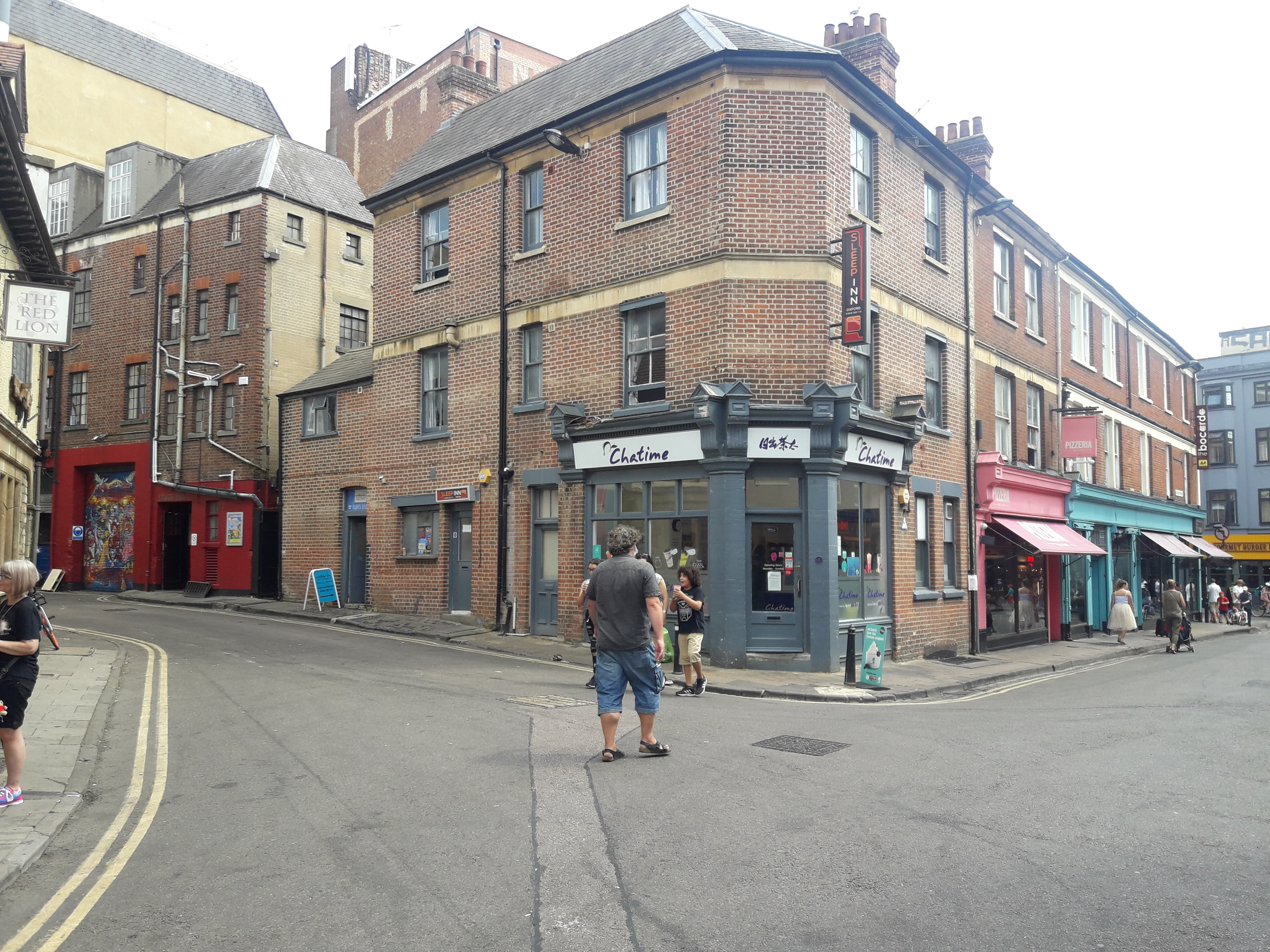
A Chatime outlet

Chatime announced in 2012 that award-winning Taiwan actress Ariel Lin would serve as its brand ambassador.

The following year, the brand announced that Crystal Lee had become the lifestyle tea provider's first "Chatime Friend". The announcement was made soon after Lee became the youngest actress ever to have won the award for Best Actress at the 16th Shanghai International Film Festival.

== Counterfeit ==
In South Korea, Chatime said it would take legal action against a store which sold similar products and was recruiting potential franchises.

== Legal & regulatory matters ==
In Malaysia, the master franchisee agreement was terminated on 5 January 2017 by La Kaffa International due to contractual dispute with its country master franchisee, Loob Holding. This legal dispute attracted the attention of local media and is currently in arbitration in Singapore. La Kaffa held a press conference in Kuala Lumpur announcing it would be taking over the Malaysian Chatime business operations and development with immediate effect. This however appears to be largely incorrect with Loob Holding rebranding 161 out of 165 Chatime outlets to Tealive brand on 17 February 2017. Due to Loob Holding's alleged use of unapproved ingredients (which were later found out to be collaborations with other brands for localization purposes), questionable practices, and a blatant breach of the terms of contract, La Kaffa International director Chen Zhao sought an injunction against the former master franchisee from operating a similar (bubble tea) business in Malaysia. On 29 May 2017, the High Court dismissed the injunction bid by La Kaffa International, against Loob Holding Sdn Bhd, from carrying a similar business as Chatime. Judicial Commissioner Wong Kian Kheong, in his oral judgement, ruled that the injunction would cause great risk of injustice to Loob Holding and its business and also associates. The court also found that the franchise termination by La Kaffa was done in bad faith. On 30 August 2018, La Kaffa and Loob reached an out-of-court settlement to amicably resolve all their disputes arising from their one-time franchise relationship of the latter's Chatime bubble tea brand and agreed to withdraw all proceedings in Malaysian courts and arbitration in Singapore. The settlement shall not constitute nor be deemed nor treated by any party as an admission of any allegation and/or liability. Parties have come to an agreement in resolution of their disputes, in which the decision has also been made to stop all court or any other enforcement actions against each other.

Chatime Australia is alleged to have underpaid 152 employees (including 42 junior workers and 95 visa holders, resulting in a loss of $169,320 in wages) of 10 company-owned outlets across in Sydney and Melbourne a total of about $169,000. During the period, Chatime Australia reportedly paid employees at company-operated stores flat rates as low as $7.59 to $24.30 per hour adopted a practice of not paying Fast Food Industry Award entitlements such as loadings and penalty rates.

Chatime South Africa and Chatime Bhutan opened in 2026: South Africa on 9 May and Bhutan on 18 June.

== See also ==
- Bubble tea
- Tea house
- Tea culture
- List of companies of Taiwan
