= LaLaport Bukit Bintang City Centre =

Shopping mall in Kuala Lumpur, Malaysia

- ららぽーとブキッビンタンシティセンター

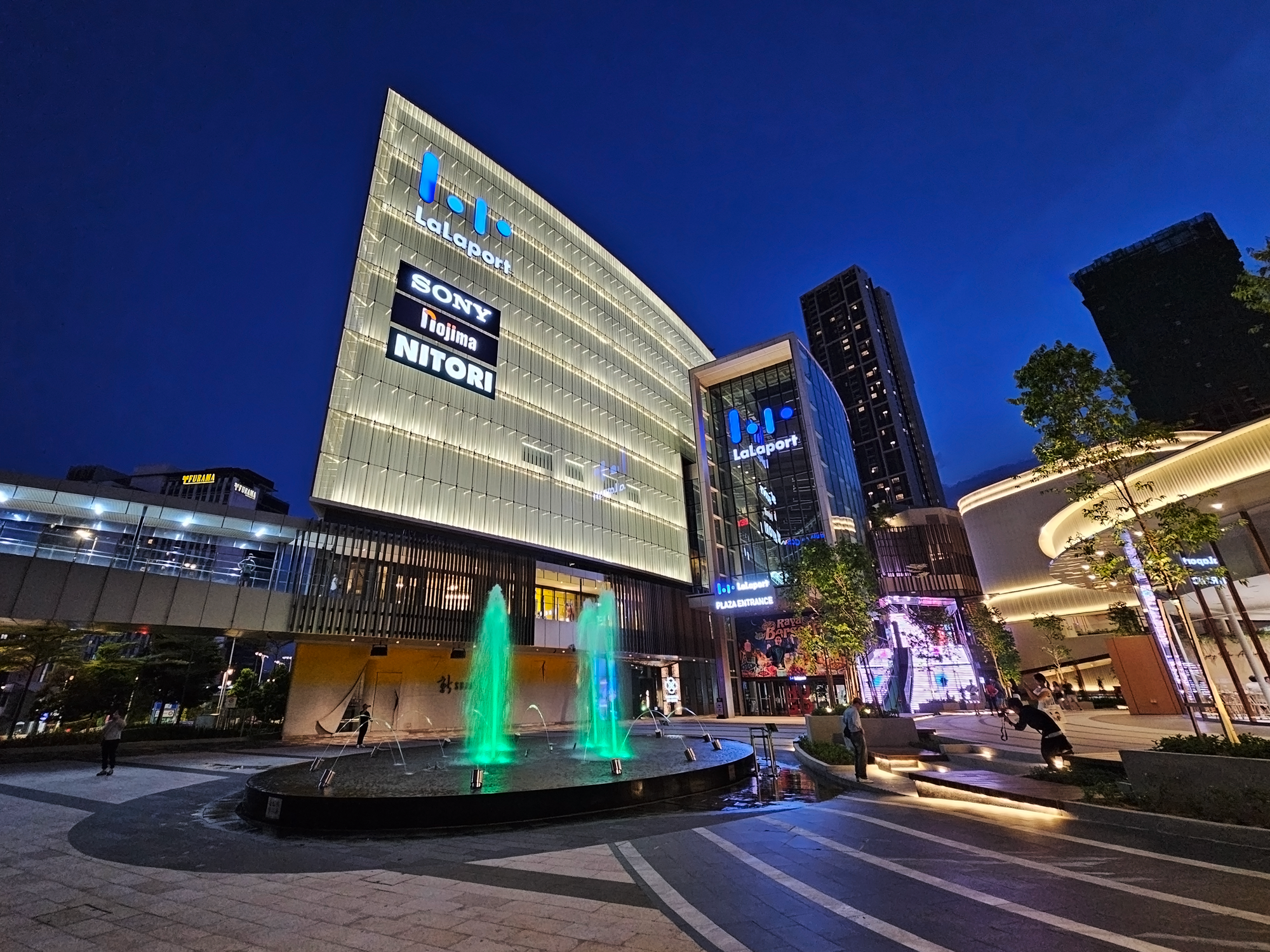
- Main entrance
- Location: Kuala Lumpur, Malaysia
- Coordinates: 3.14069°N 101.70801°E
- Address: 2, Jalan Hang Tuah, Bukit Bintang City Centre, 55100 Kuala Lumpur, Malaysia
- Opened: 20 January 2022; 4 years ago (soft opening)
- Previous names: Mitsui Shopping Park LaLaport Kuala Lumpur
- Developer: BBCC Development Sdn Bhd
- Manager: MFBBCC Retail Mall Sdn. Bhd.
- Owner: Mitsui Fudosan
- Architect: GDP Architects Sdn Bhd
- Num. of stores: 300+
- Num. of anchor tenants: BookXcess, Jaya Grocer, Metrojaya, MR.DIY, Nitori, Nojima, PartyBox 360, Rollerwa
- Floor area: 890,000 square feet (83,000 m^{2})
- Floors: 7 (Mall); 5 (Basement carpark)
- Parking: 2,400+
- Public transit: AG9 SP9 MR4 BBCC-Hang Tuah station
- Website: mitsui-shopping-park.com.my

The Mitsui Shopping Park LaLaport Bukit Bintang City Centre (Japanese: 三井ショッピングパークららぽーと ブキッ・ビンタンシティセンター; Hepburn: Mitsui Shoppingupāku Rarapōto Bukītsu Bintan Shiti Sentā), also known as LaLaport Bukit Bintang City Centre and LaLaport BBCC, is a Japanese lifestyle shopping mall located within Bukit Bintang City Centre (BBCC). It was built under a joint venture between BBBC and Mitsui Fudosan, a real estate company based in Tokyo by the Mitsui Group.

The entire space has a total built-up area of 1,400,000 square feet (130,000 m^{2}) across 6 floors with mix of local and international retail brands including some exclusively from Japan. It consists of approximately 400 stores spanning across 82,600 square metres of retail floor space.

The mall is also connected to the entertainment hub of BBCC on the east which consists of Golden Screen Cinemas, Zepp Kuala Lumpur, among others. A cafeteria and depachika food hall based on Japanese basement-level F&B are located on the lower ground floor named Depachika Marche, while a food court is located on the fourth floor of the mall. LaLaport BBCC features a number of attractions, most notably a rooftop garden.

It was scheduled to open in 2021 but was further delayed due to the Movement Control Order caused by the COVID-19 pandemic in the country. The mall was officially opened to the public on 20 January 2022, making it as the first LaLaport in Southeast Asia as well as the second LaLaport to open outside of Japan after LaLaport Shanghai Jinqiao.

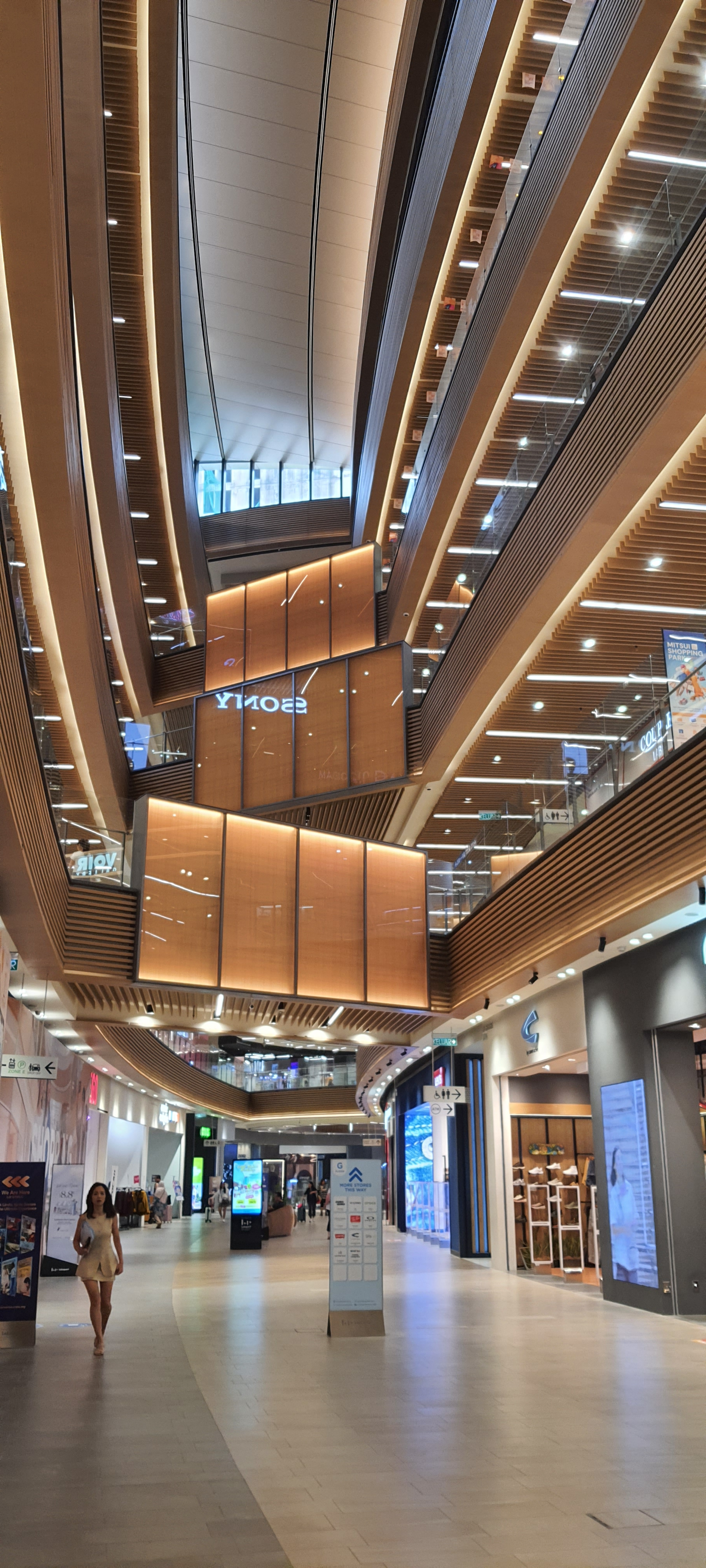
An interior shot of the mall.
