= Bukit Bintang City Centre =

Neighborhood in Bukit Bintang, Kuala Lumpur, Malaysia

Bukit Bintang City Centre Pusat Bandar Bukit Bintang
- Neighbourhood of Kuala Lumpur
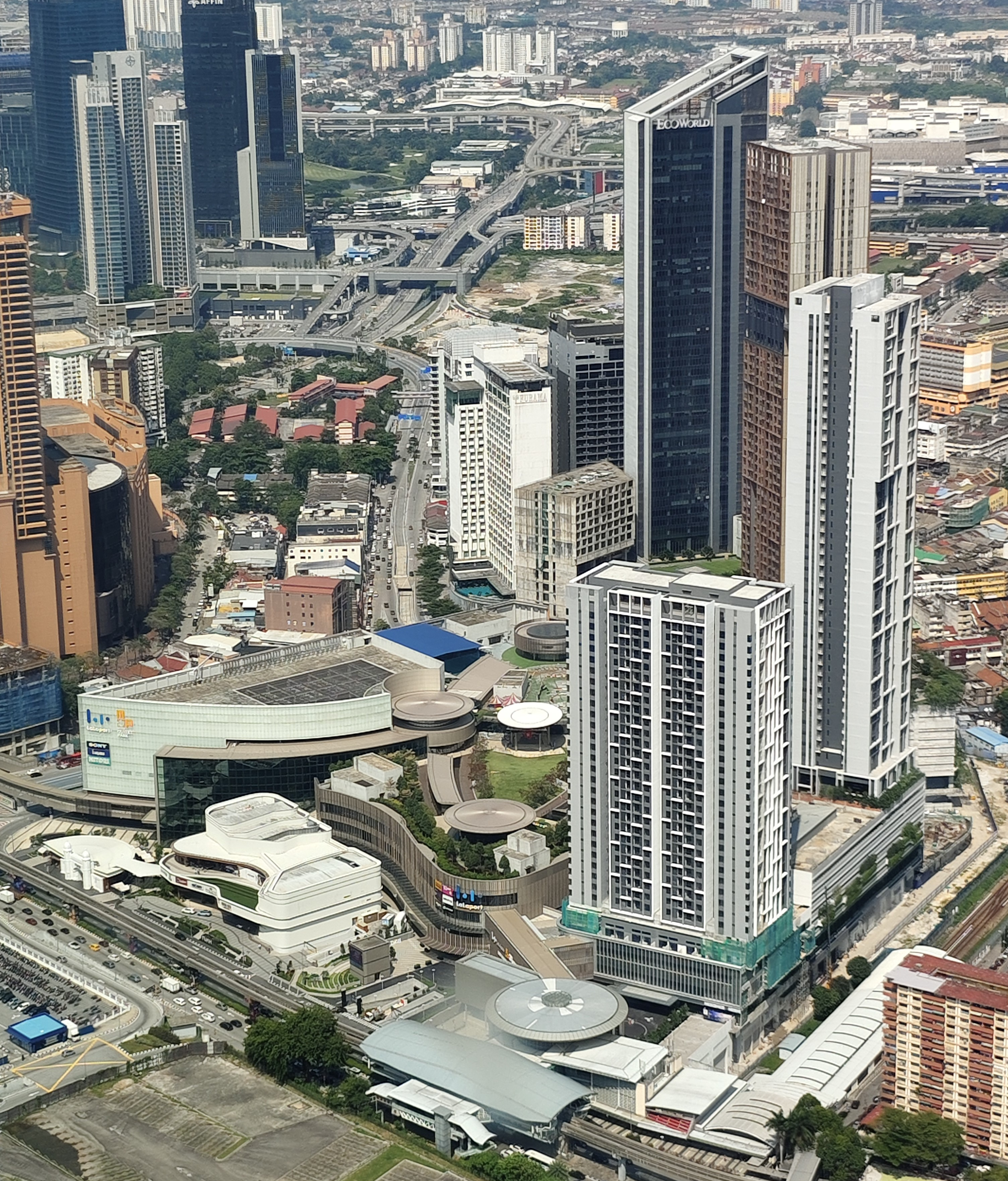
- Bukit Bintang City Centre as seen from Merdeka 118 on August 2025

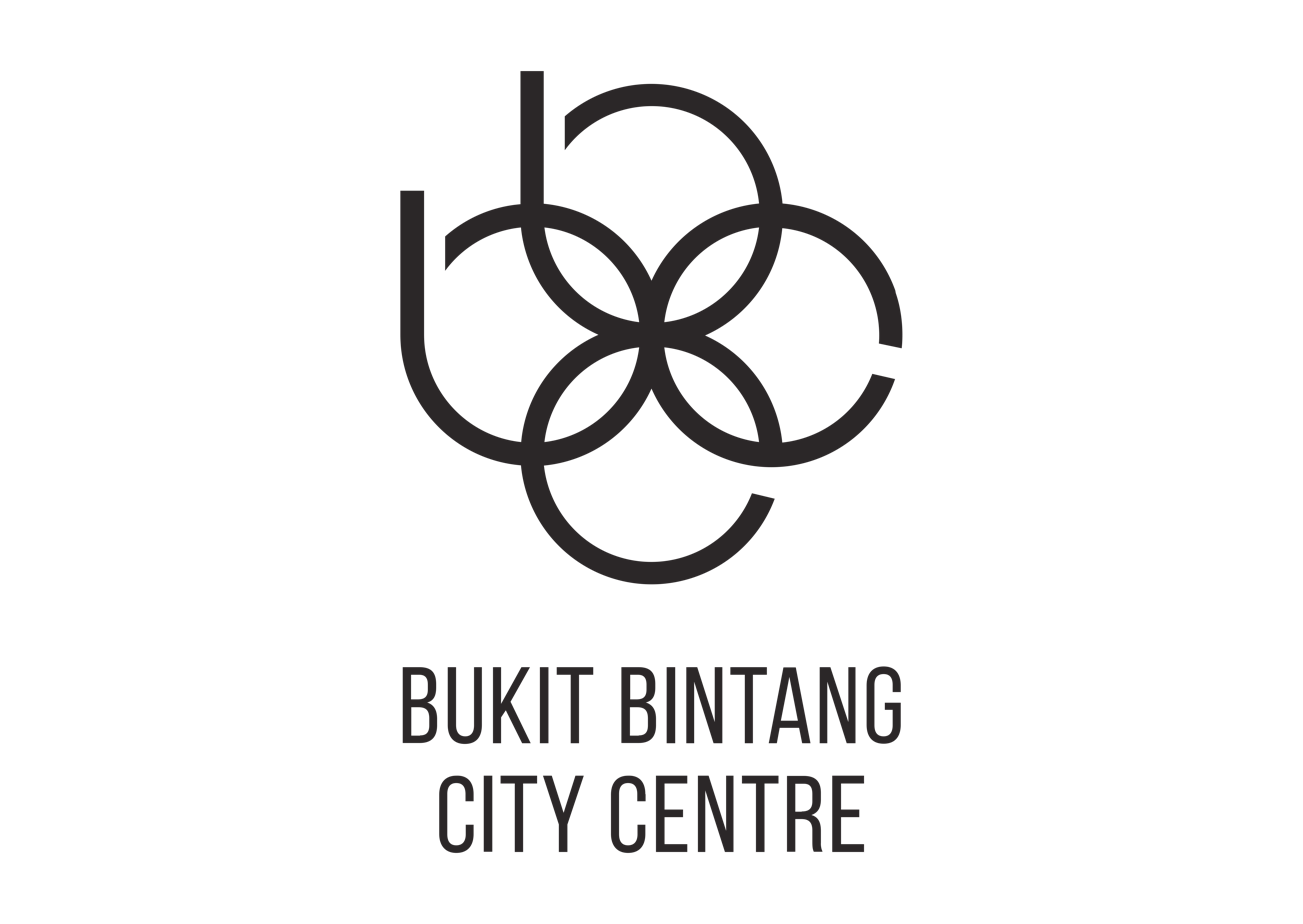
- Logo
- Nickname: BBCC
- Motto: Where Life Is Spectacular
- Interactive map of Bukit Bintang City Centre
- Coordinates: 3.140°N 101.707°E
- Country: Malaysia
- Federal Territory: Kuala Lumpur
- Constituency: Bukit Bintang
- Status: Partially completed
- First opened: January 2022

Government
  - Type: City council
  - Body: Kuala Lumpur City Hall

Area
  - Total: 7.9 ha (19.4 acres)
- Time zone: UTC+8 (Malaysia Standard Time)
- Postal code: 55100
- Website: bbcckl.com

Bukit Bintang City Centre (BBCC, Malay: Pusat Bandar Bukit Bintang) is a 19.4 acres (7.9 ha) mixed-use development on the former site of the Pudu Prison in Kuala Lumpur, Malaysia. The development is located at the south western end of Bukit Bintang, bordering with the Pudu district along Jalan Hang Tuah (formerly Jalan Shaw) and Jalan Pudu.

BBCC is a joint development between EcoWorld, the Urban Development Authority (UDA) and the Employees Provident Fund Board (EPF). EcoWorld was then given the responsibility to develop the whole land as the development manager of the site.

The groundbreaking ceremony for BBCC and Mitsui Shopping Park LaLaport was witnessed by former Prime Minister Najib Tun Razak on 20 June 2017. Construction works on the RM8.7 billion project started later in Q1 2018.

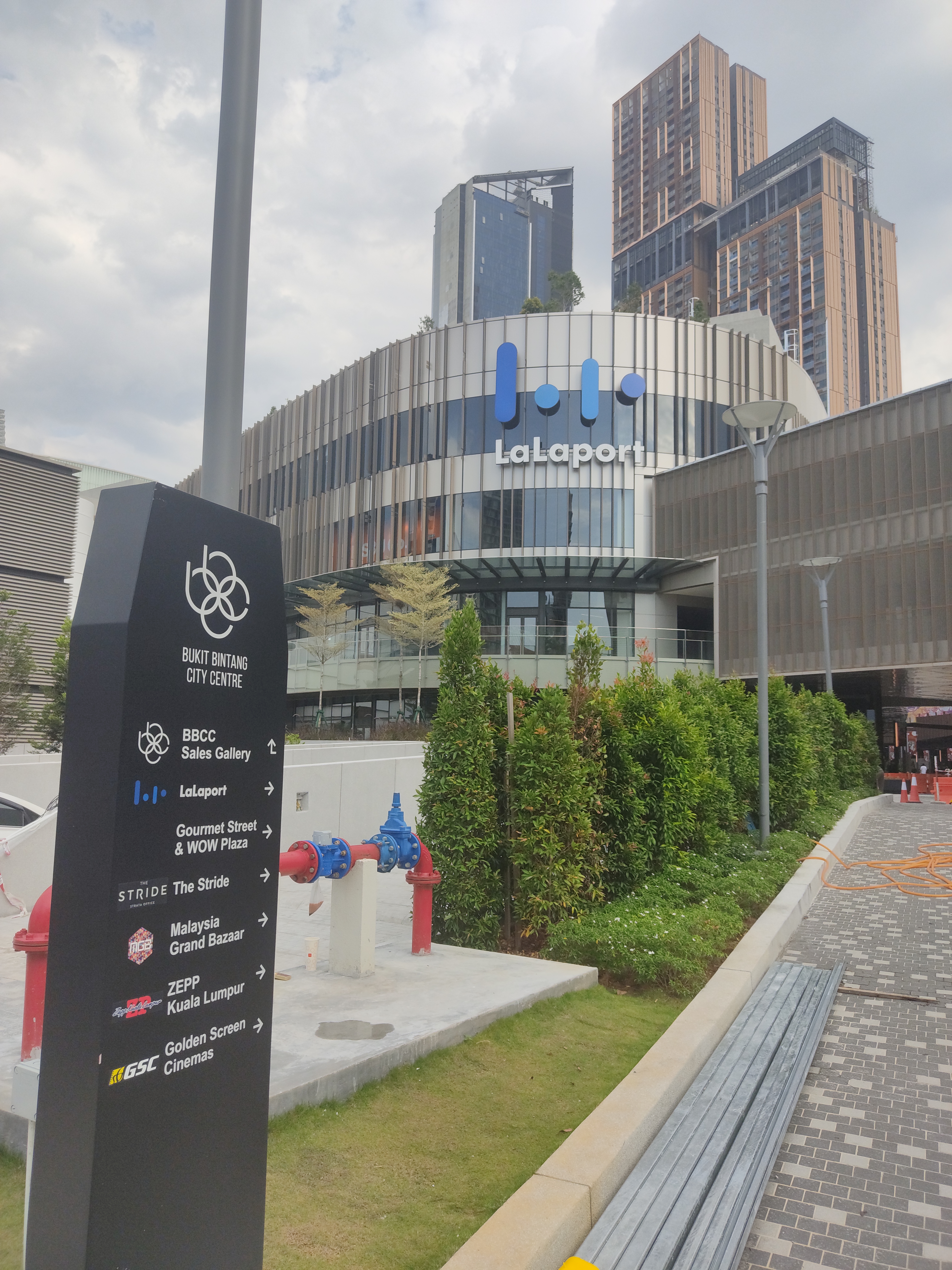
A directory of BBCC with Lucentia and The Stride towers in the background.

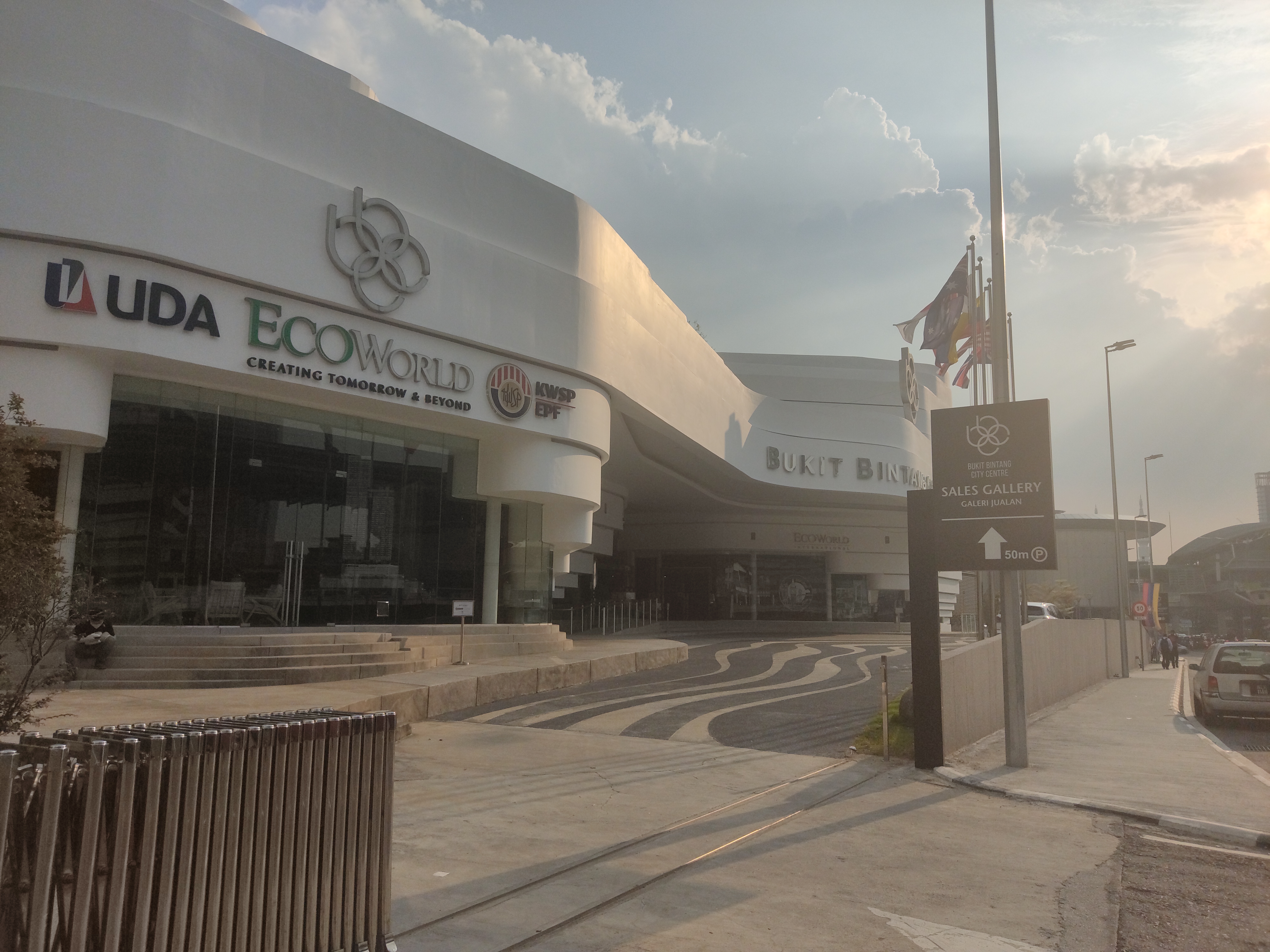
Front view of the BBCC sales gallery

== History ==
The site of BBCC was previously part of the infamous Pudu Prison (Penjara Pudu) which was built in the 1890s on a 10-hectare site. After the prison was uninhabited in 1996, it was opened to the public and became the first prison in Asia to open for public visits. It was also turned into a temporary prison museum for a period of 6 months. Demolition of the prison walls began in 2010, which was at one time the world's longest mural, and by 2012 the main prison complex was fully demolished. Today, its main gates are the only portion that is still standing and maintained. It has been preserved by repainting and retaining its original shape as a historical imprint of the original site..

On the night of 25 January 2019, there was an incident where a slab collapsed at the construction site. The developer confirmed this was a localised failure of a slab. Although there were no injuries nor deaths, the affected area was sealed off for further investigations while work of the site resumed as normal.

== Masterplan ==
The developer had submitted the latest master plan to the Kuala Lumpur City Hall (DBKL) to be located in the Golden Triangle area of Kuala Lumpur's busiest shopping district. BBCC Development Sdn Bhd was then formed to undertake the whole project, with the development to be 66% owned by RnH Berhad and 33% owned by UDA. A total of nine towers have been planned for the development of BBCC, along with two malls.

=== Completed ===
- BBCC Transit Hub (connection with Hang Tuah LRT and Monorail stations)
- BBCC Entertainment Hub (Zepp KL, GSC Cineplex, Malaysia Grand Bazaar and a banquet hall)
- Gourmet Street (part of LaLaport's outdoor section)
- Lifestyle Mall (Mitsui Shopping Park LaLaport BBCC)
- 55-storey and 35-storey, 215.1m and 155m Residential Suites (Lucentia Residences) - 2022
- 48-storey & 245.5m Office Tower (The Stride Strata Office) - 2022
- 44-storey & 185m Japanese Serviced Apartment (Mitsui Serviced Suites) - 2024

=== Under construction ===
- 31-storey & 108m Residential Suites 4 (SWNK Houze) - 2025
- 50-storey & 259.5m Residential Suites 3 (a residential block) - 2026
- Hotel, 123m (a proposed hotel block, the building was previously under Canopy by Hilton) - 2025
- Office Tower, 192m (an office block) - 2026
- An 80-storey building & 430.2m (BBCC Signature Tower) - unknown

== Mitsui Shopping Park LaLaport BBCC ==
LaLaport Bukit Bintang City Centre
- ららぽーとブキッビンタンシティセンター

- The Gate Plaza at LaLaport's main entrance
- Coordinates: 3.14069°N 101.70801°E
- Address: 2, Jalan Hang Tuah, Bukit Bintang City Centre, 55100 Kuala Lumpur, Malaysia
- Opened: 20 January 2022; 4 years ago (soft opening)
- Previous names: Mitsui Shopping Park LaLaport Kuala Lumpur
- Developer: BBCC Development Sdn Bhd
- Manager: MFBBCC Retail Mall Sdn. Bhd.
- Owner: Mitsui Fudosan
- Architect: GDP Architects Sdn Bhd
- Num. of stores: 550+
- Num. of anchor tenants: BookXcess, Don Don Donki, Golden Screen Cinemas, Jaya Grocer, Metrojaya, MR.DIY, Nitori, Nojima, PartyBox 360
- Floor area: 200,000 square feet (19,000 m^{2})
- Floors: 9 (Retail); 5 (Basement carpark)
- Parking: 5,500+
- Public transit: AG9 SP9 MR4 BBCC-Hang Tuah station (KL Monorail, LRT Ampang and Sri Petaling Lines)
- Website: mitsui-shopping-park.com.my/lalaportbbcc/

The Mitsui Shopping Park LaLaport Bukit Bintang City Centre (Japanese: 三井ショッピングパークららぽーと ブキッ・ビンタンシティセンター, Mitsui shoppingupāku rarapo ̄ to buki~tsu Bintan shiti sentā), also known as LaLaport Bukit Bintang City Centre and LaLaport BBCC, is a Japanese lifestyle shopping mall located within BBCC. It is a RM1.6 billion mall under a joint venture agreement between BBCC Development Sdn Bhd and Mitsui Fudosan Co. Ltd. (Asia), a real estate company of the Mitsui Group. The entire space has a total built-up area of 1,400,000 square feet (130,000 m^{2}) across 6 floors with mix of local and international retail brands including some exclusively from Japan. It consists of approximately 400 stores spanning across 82,600 square metres of retail floor space.

The mall is also connected to the entertainment hub of BBCC on the east which consists of Golden Screen Cinemas, Zepp Kuala Lumpur, Malaysia Grand Bazaar and Grand Banquet Hall. Among the Japanese stores to first open in Malaysia include electronic store brand Nojima, household brand Nitori, Zoff, Mini One by DONQ, pet shop Coo&RIKU, Matcha Eight, Shin'Labo, Tamaruya Honten Steakhouse, Nitinagin&Co, Star Child and Yakiniku Sizzle by YAKINIQUEST. A cafeteria and depachika food hall based on Japanese basement-level F&B are located on the lower ground floor named Depachika Marche, while the Garden Dining food court is located on the fourth floor of the mall. LaLaport BBCC features a number of attractions such as the Central Rooftop Garden, WOW Plaza, Gourmet Street, Grand Steps and Gate Plaza.

It was scheduled to open in 2021 but was further delayed due to the Movement Control Order caused by the COVID-19 pandemic in the country. The mall was officially open to the public on 20 January 2022, making it as the first LaLaport in Southeast Asia as well as the second LaLaport to open outside of Japan after LaLaport Shanghai Jinqiao.

== Transportation and accessibility ==
This development is currently served by the 3 LRT Ampang Line, 4 LRT Sri Petaling Line and 8 KL Monorail of the AG9 SP9 MR4 BBCC–Hang Tuah station. The station is directly linked with the Mitsui Shopping Park LaLaport mall via its transit hub as well as the whole development from Entrance D of the station.

BBCC is also accessible from the KG17 Merdeka MRT station on the 9 MRT Kajang Line via a linkage walkway which is a 5-minute walk northwest from the transit hub.

There is a total of 6 entrances to the underground parking lot. It is easily accessible from a number of roads around the development including Jalan Hang Tuah, Jalan Pudu and Jalan Changkat Thambi Dollah.

== Gallery ==
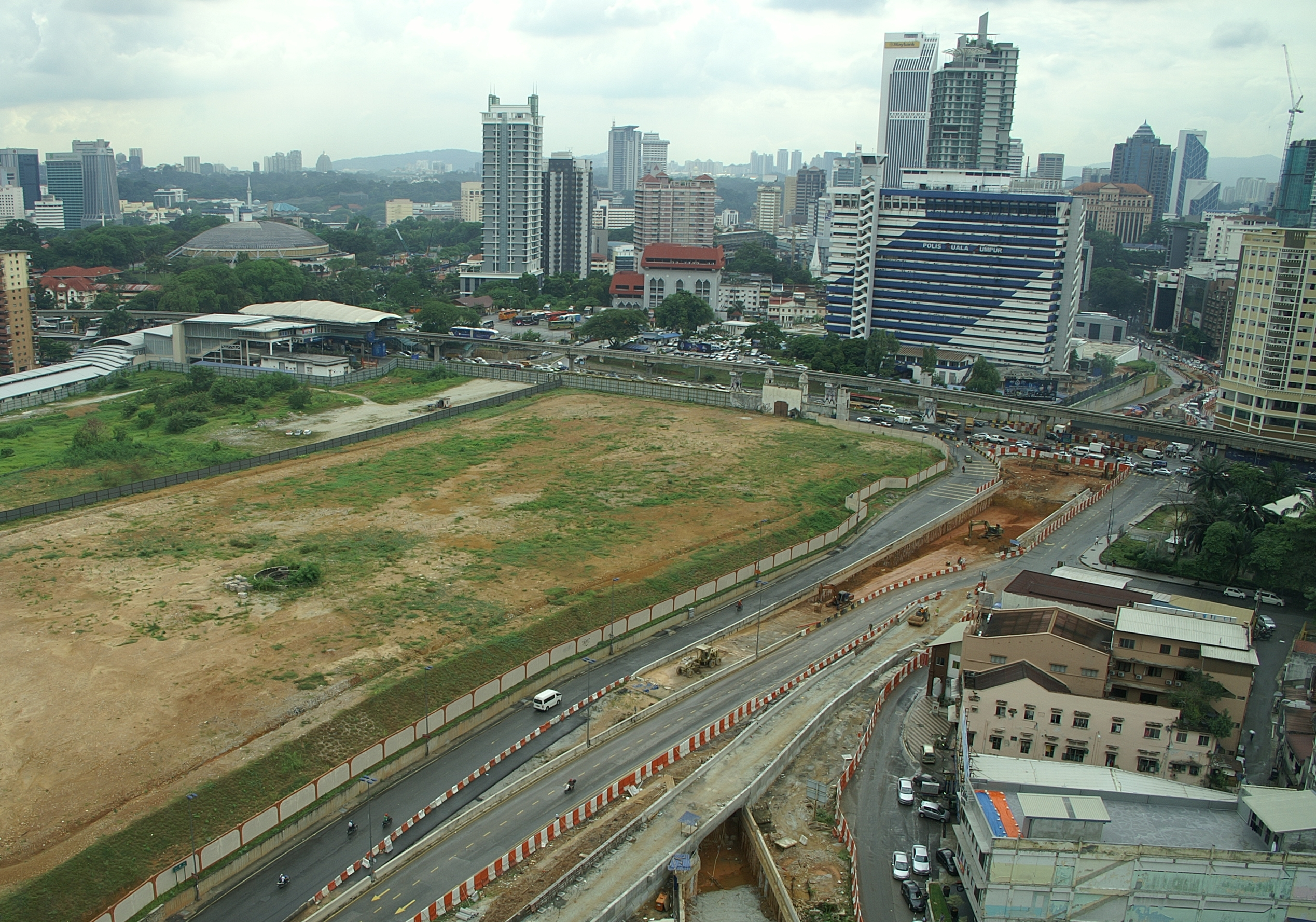
The site of BBCC in 2013 before construction

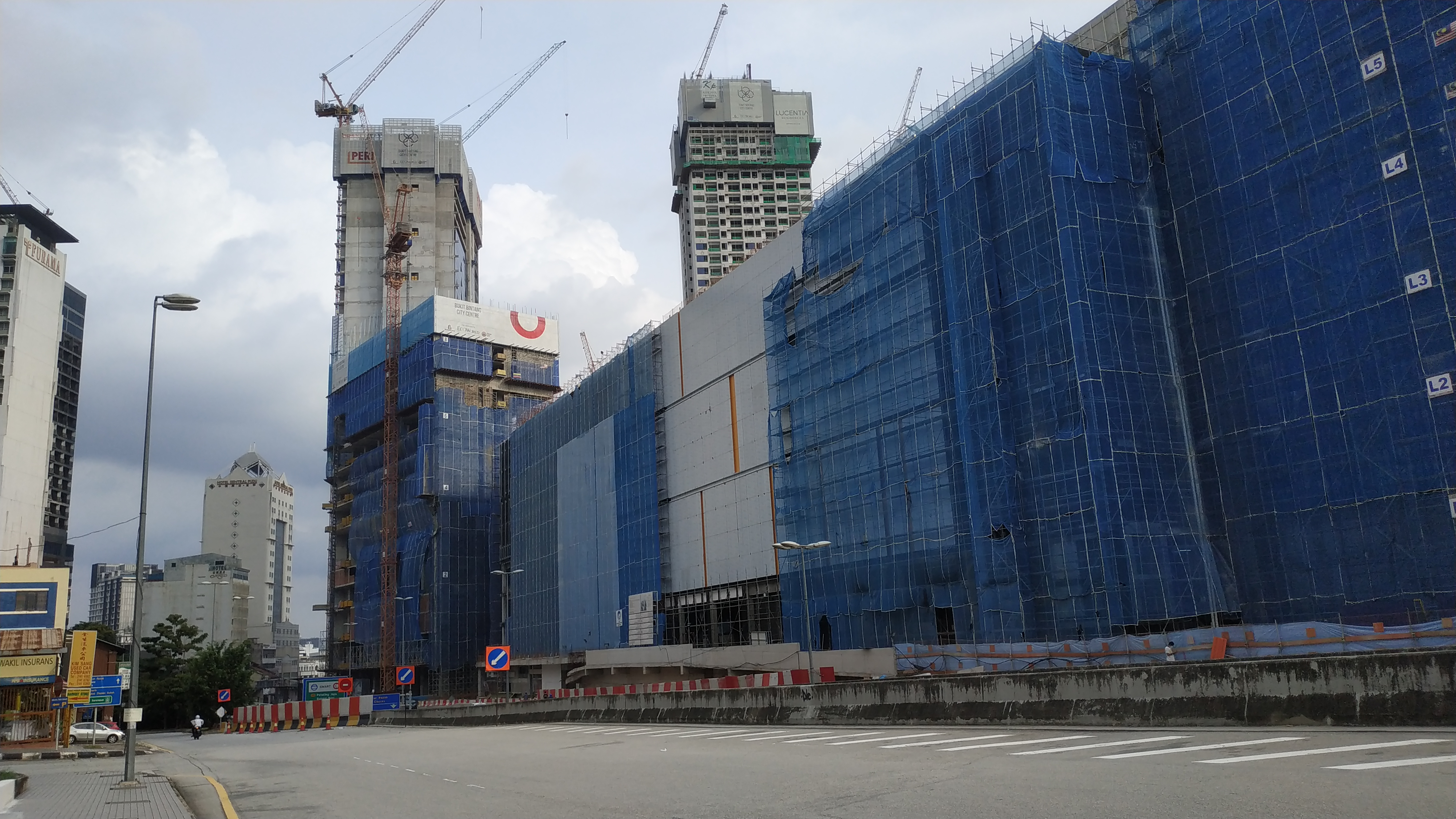
Construction of the BBCC development in 2020

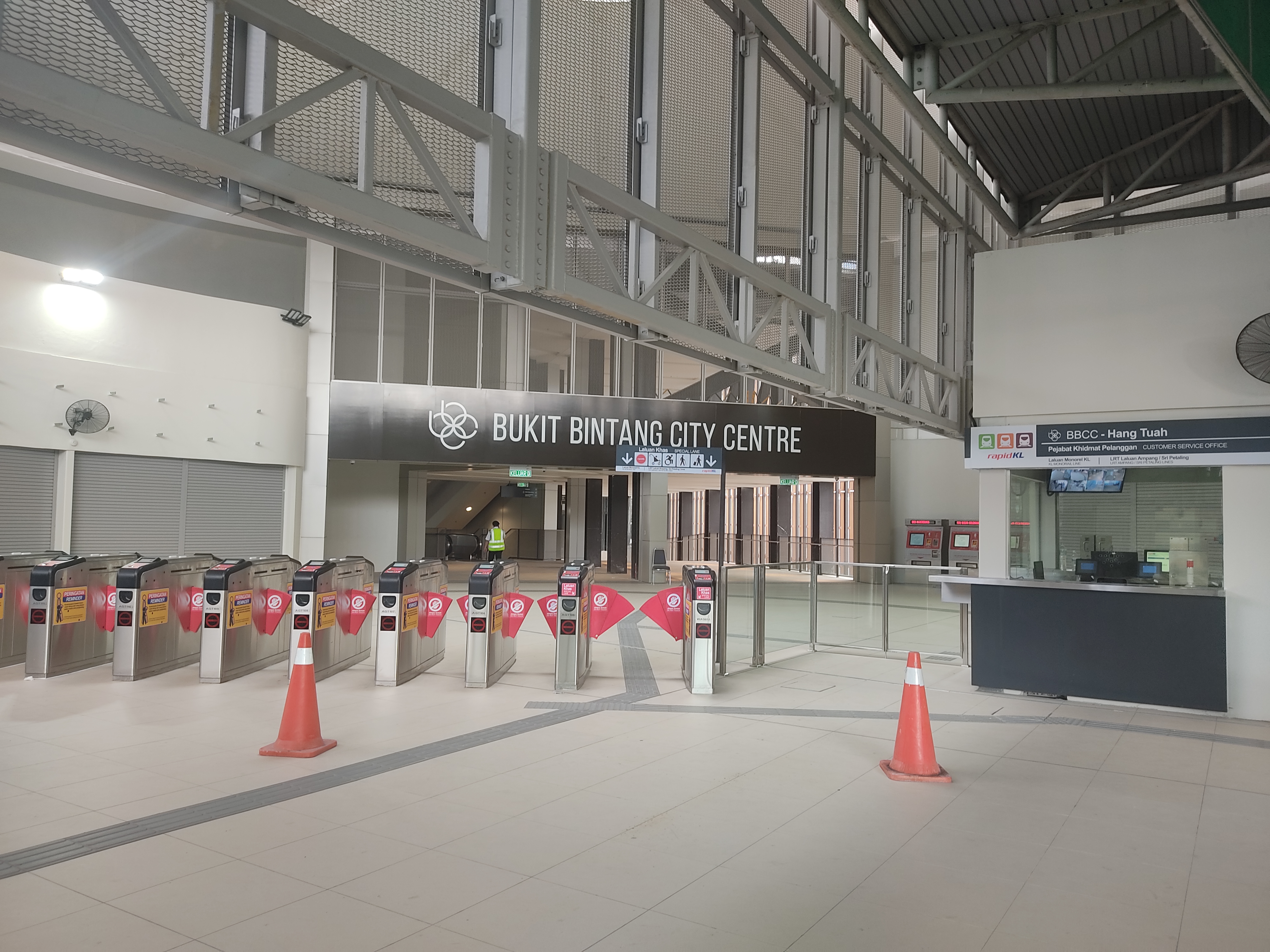
The BBCC Transit Hub

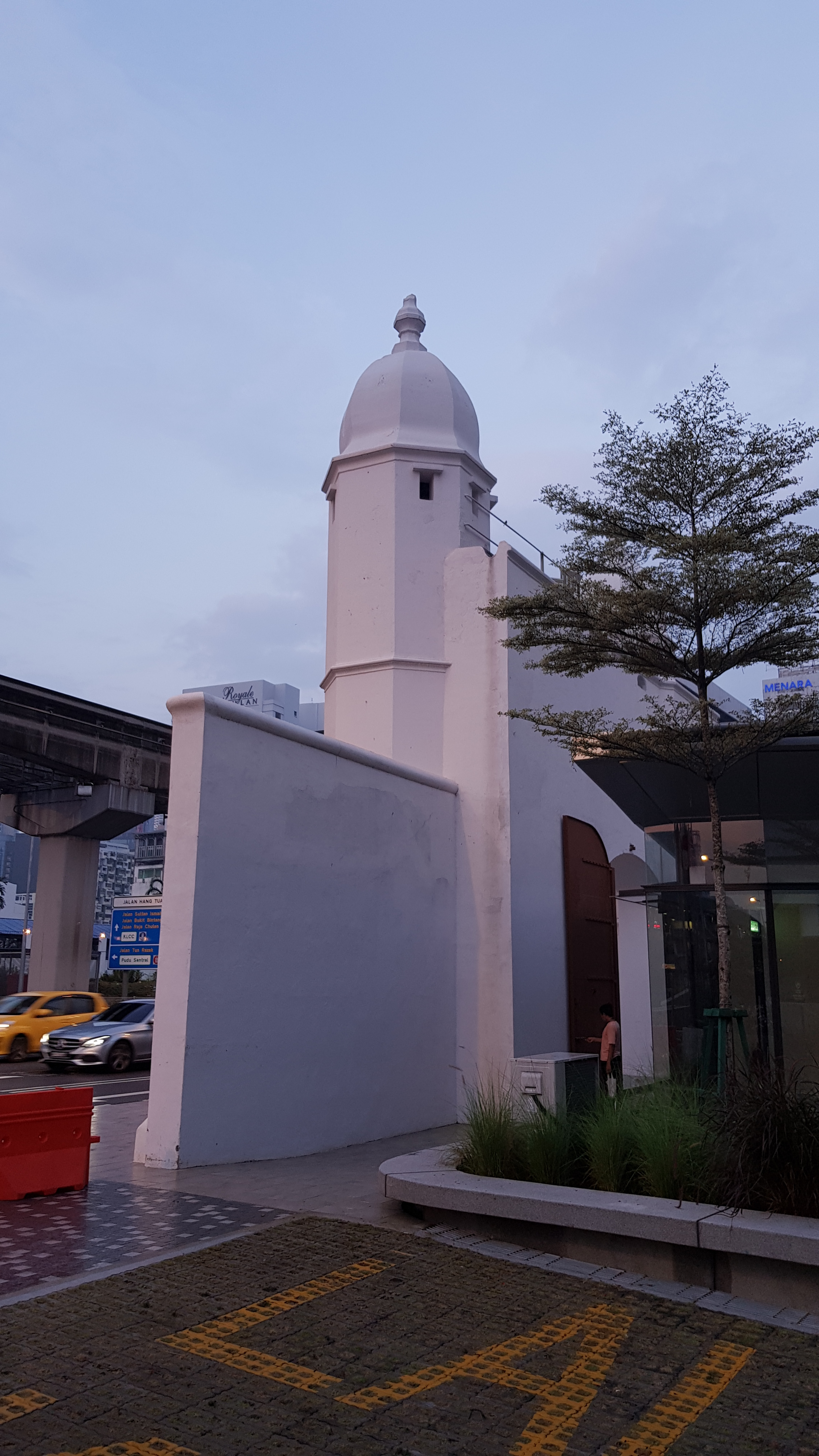
Entrance gate of the former Pudu Jail, viewed from rear.

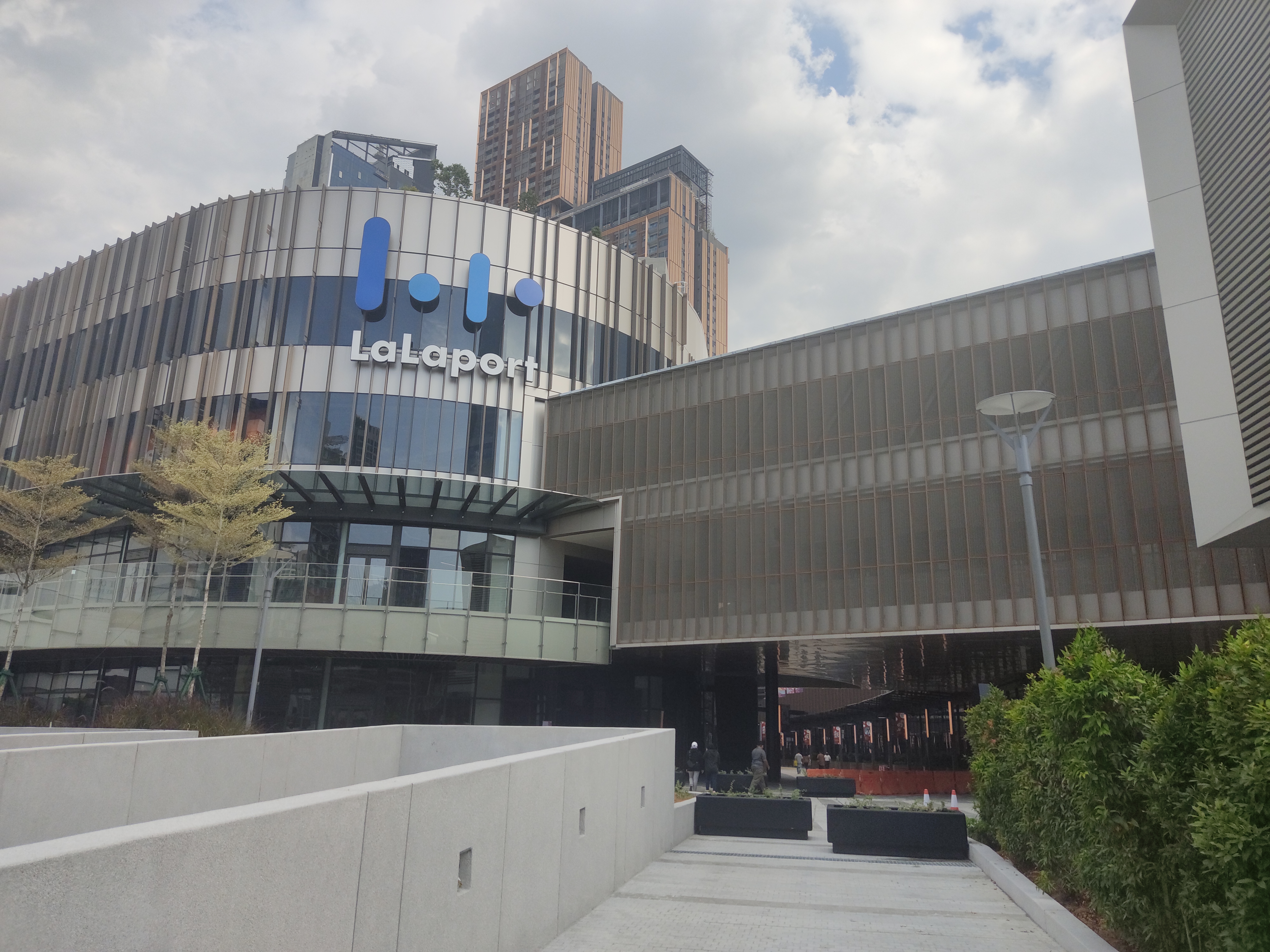
West entrance of LaLaport towards the Gourmet Street of BBCC

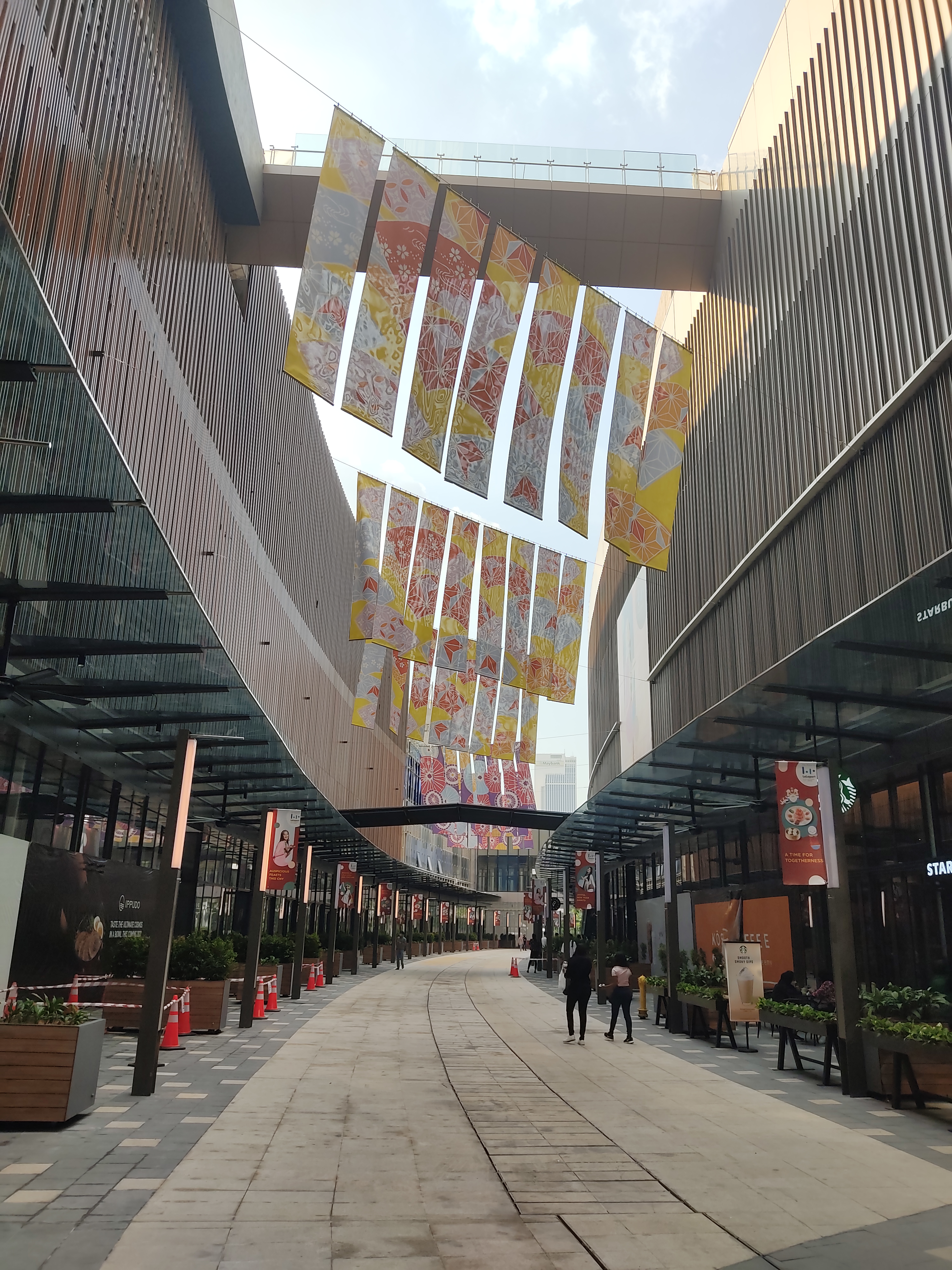
Gourmet Street with al-fresco dining spots

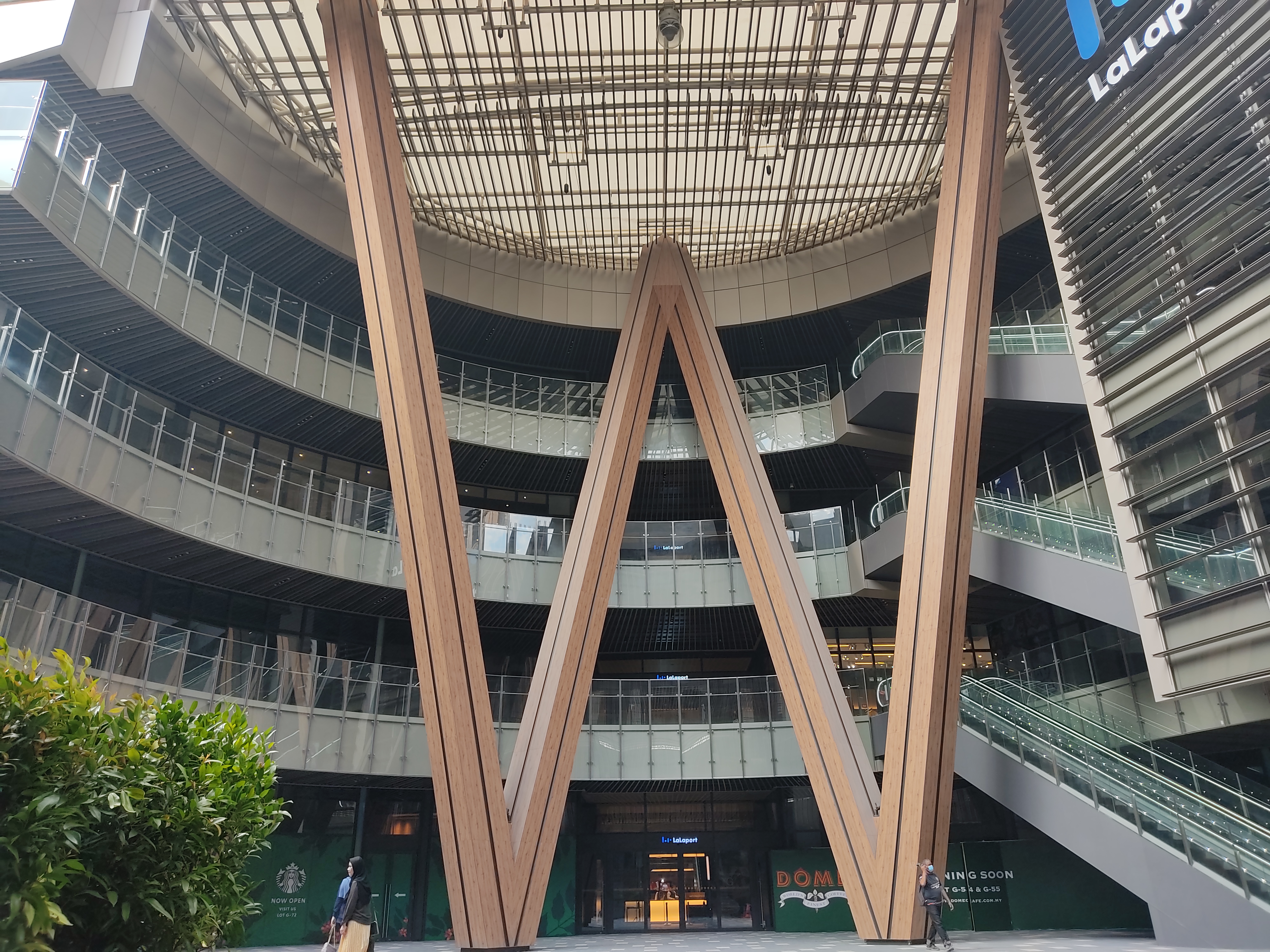
WOW Plaza is located along Gourmet Street

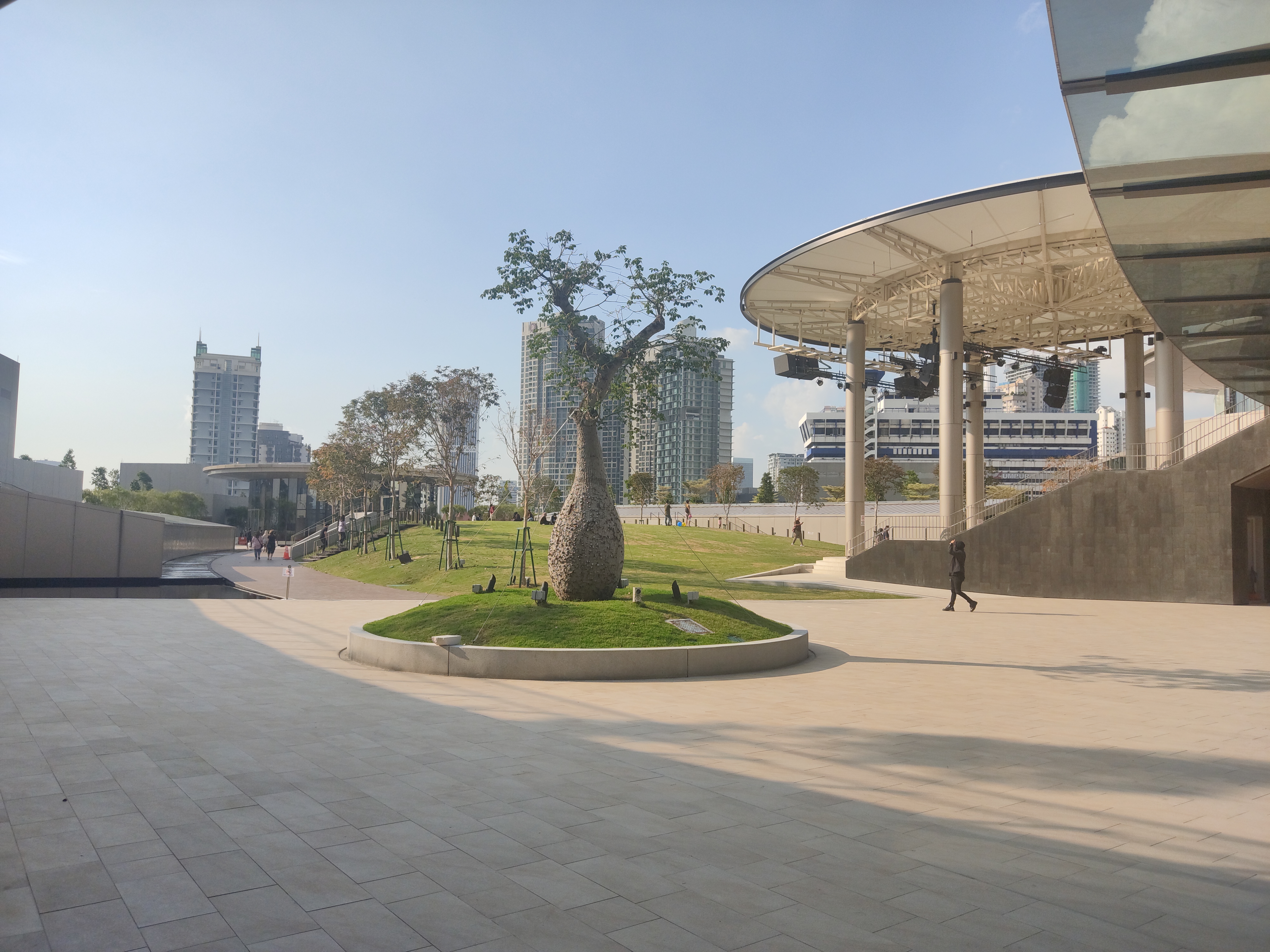
The Central Rooftop Garden located at Level 4 of the mall

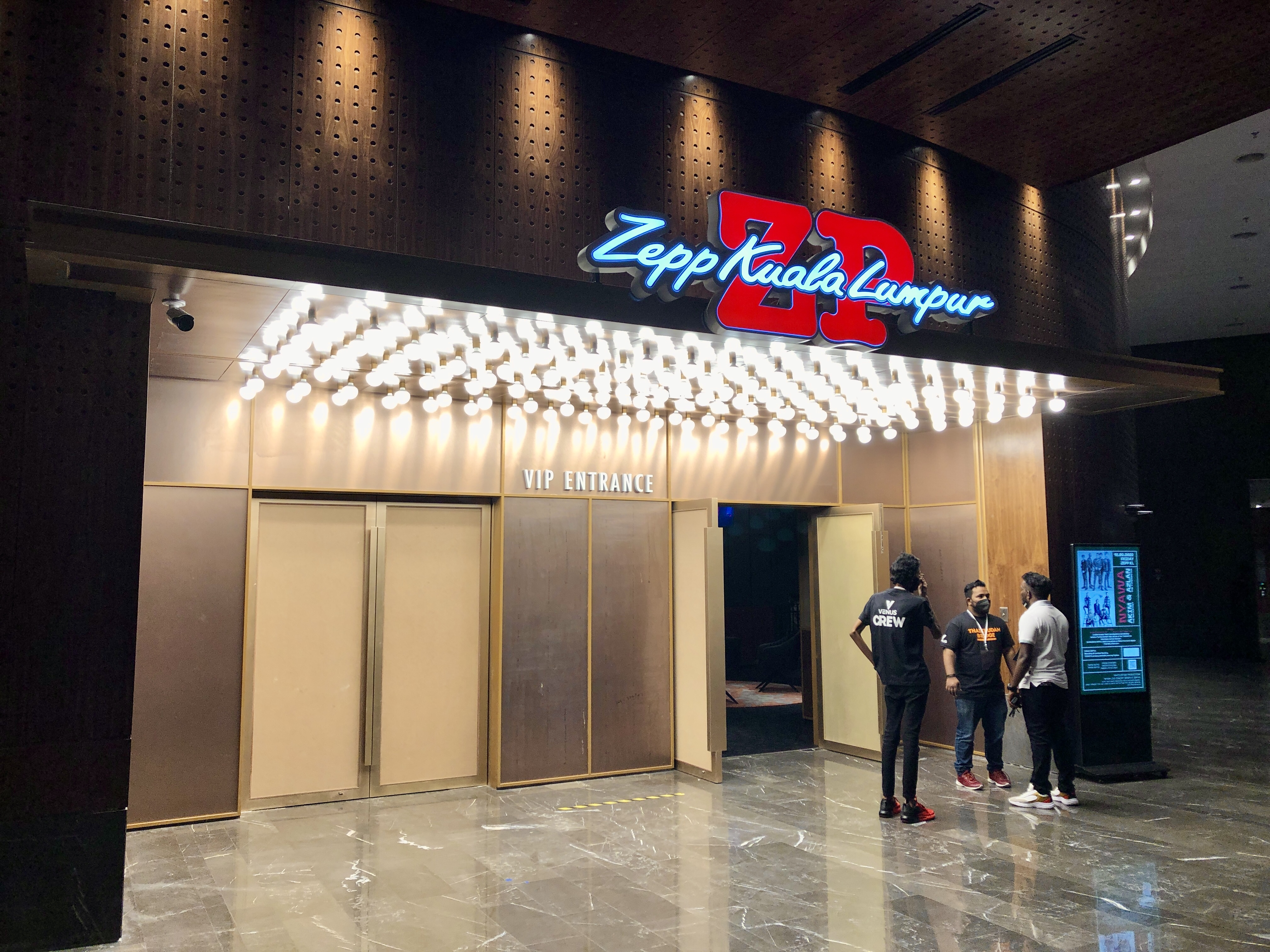
Zepp Kuala Lumpur at the BBCC Hub, accessible from Level B2 & LG1

Malaysia Grand Bazaar (MGB), an artisanal mall located to the east of Lalaport

Interior view of the Malaysia Grand Bazaar mall.

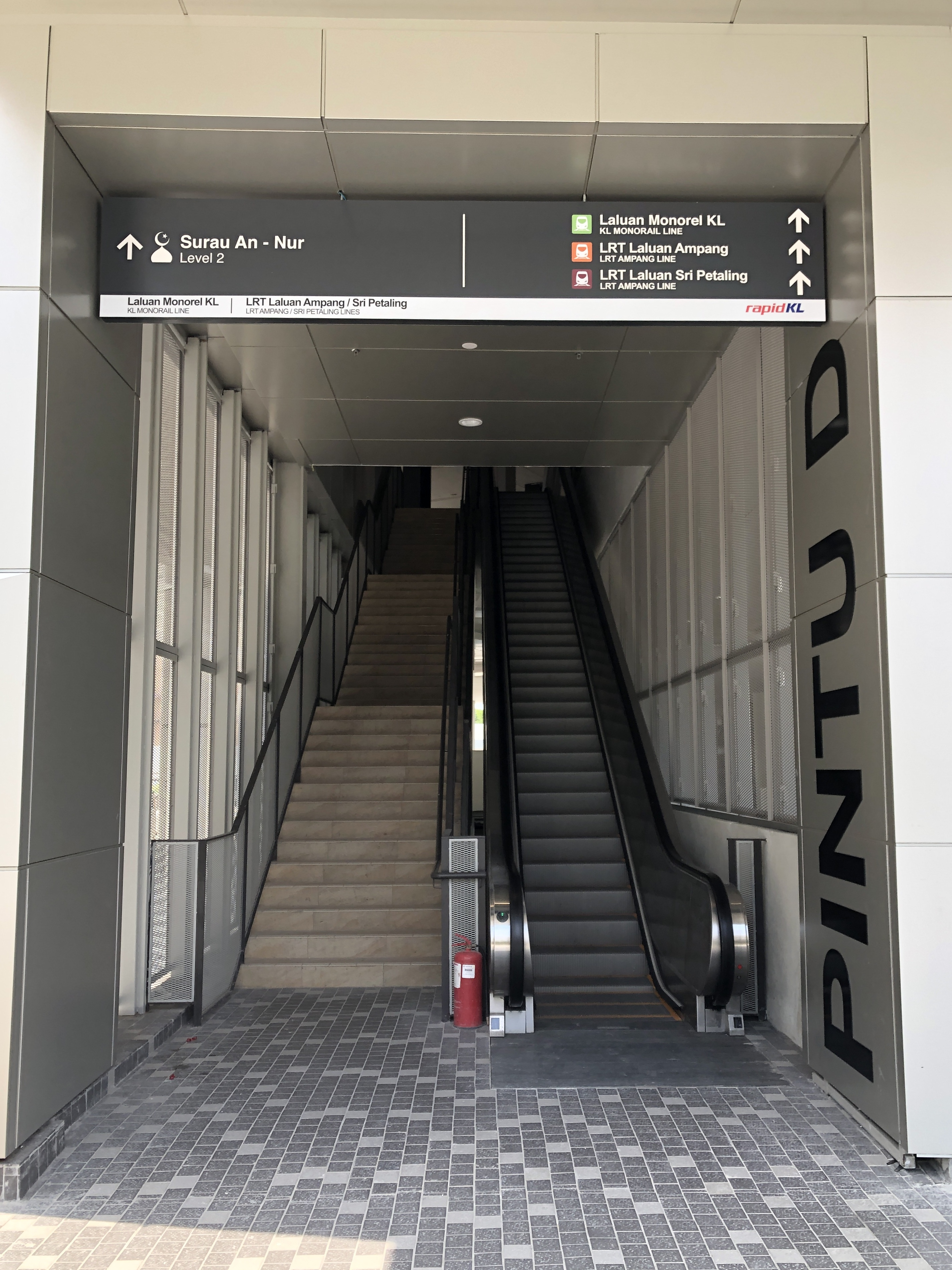
Entrance D of the transit hub from Gourmet Street

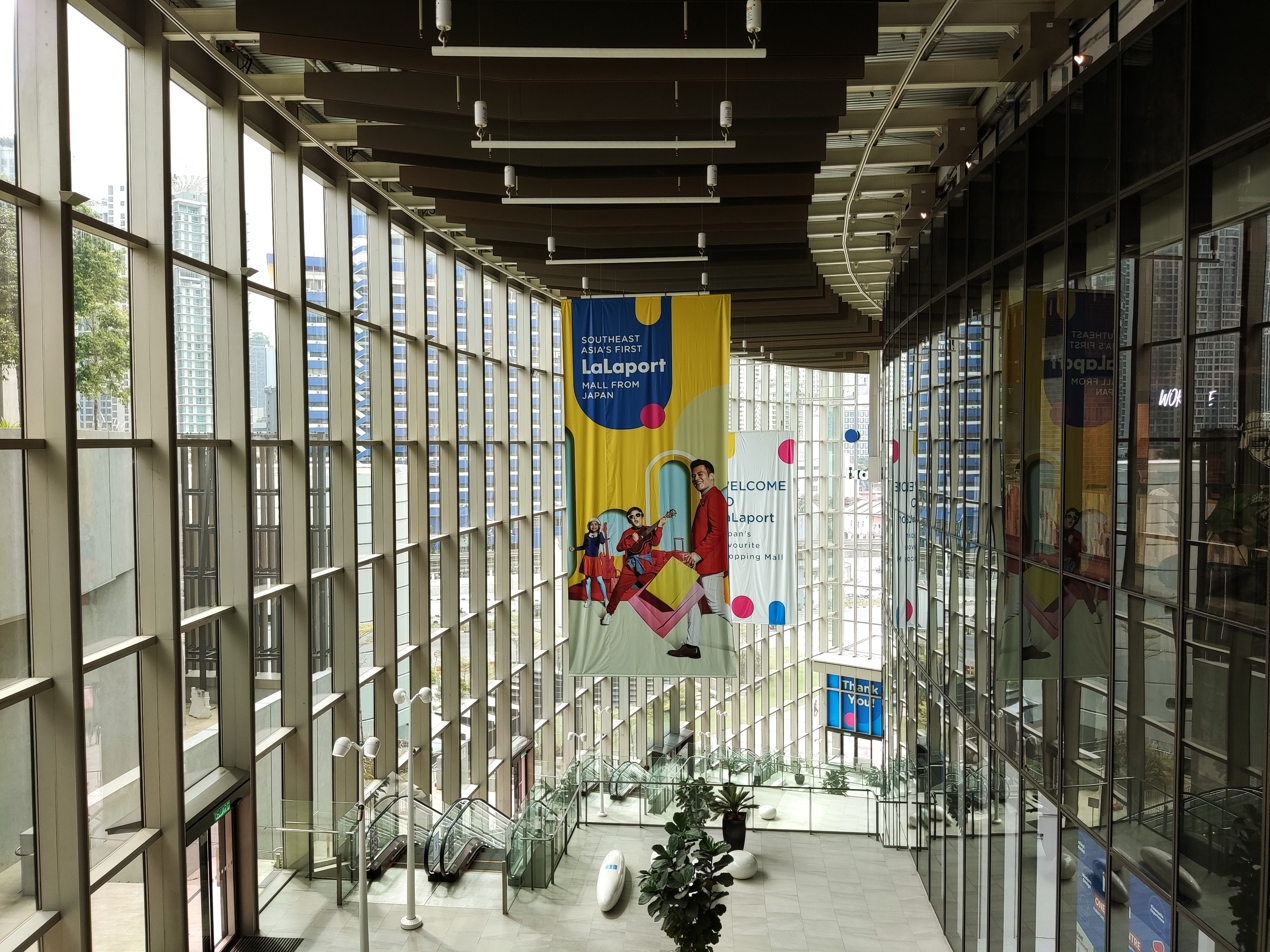
Interior view of LaLaport BBCC

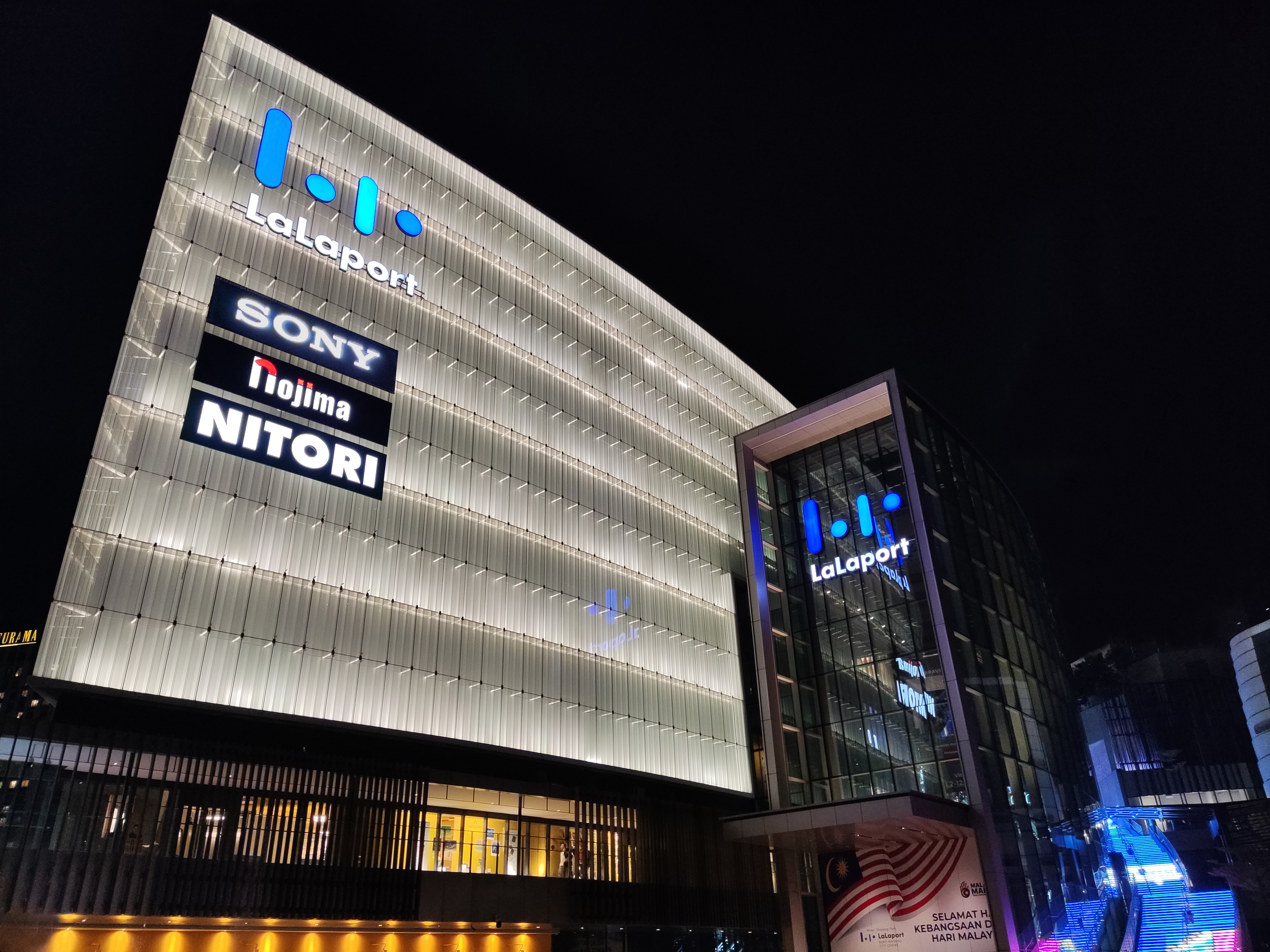
The Gate Plaza at night

== See also ==
- List of shopping malls in Malaysia
- Malaysian National Projects
