= BBCC =

BBCC may refer to:

- Bad Boy Chiller Crew, a Yorkshire Rap collective from Bradford, England
- Bukit Bintang City Centre, a mixed-use development in Kuala Lumpur, Malaysia
