= MR.DIY (Thailand) =

MR.DIY Thailand
- Type: Private
- Industry: Retail
- Number of locations: 602 (April 2023)
- Area served: Thailand
- Website: www.mrdiy.com/th/

MR.DIY Thailand is the Thai subsidiary of home improvement retailer MR.DIY. There are 602 MR.DIY stores in operation in Thailand as of March 2023.

== History ==
The first store opened in 2016 at SeaconBangkae. MR.DIY celebrated the 500th store at Lotus's Bangkapi in 2022.

=== 2020 ===
MR.DIY Thailand joined forces with Ayutthaya City Park by donating funds for medical equipment for the Ayutthaya Hospital. They also teamed up with the Thai Red Cross Society to fight against COVID-19 by providing masks and alcohol gel. They distributed face shields to 3 major retailers in order to promote basic self-prevention and lessen the risk of COVID-19 infection.

With the help from the Thai Red Cross Society once again, MR.DIY Thailand organized the 1st “One drop of blood, saves one life” among its employees as an action taken from the lessening number of blood in the inventory due to COVID-19. MR.DIY Thailand donated essential and educational equipment to children at Ban Huay Nok Lae, Tak province for its 2nd CSR activity under the name of “Giving Kindness to Children”.

=== 2021 ===
MR.DIY supports the fight against COVID-19 by donating 5,500,000 baht worth of medical and essential equipment including electric beds, PPE kits, KN95 masks, N95 masks and COVID-19 test kits to Police Hospital Foundation and Phayao Hospital. The company delivered various aids, necessities and funds worth 9 million baht to hospitals in Bangkok and its vicinity as a support to doctors and teams involved in fighting COVID-19. MR.DIY delivered PPE kits, rice, drinking water and necessities worth 120,000 baht to the Samut Prakan Province community.

MR.DIY Thailand distributed a set of necessary equipment such as hand sanitizer gel, PPE kits, masks, face shields, Lianhua medicine etc. to the Chiang Mai communities.

=== 2022 ===
MR.DIY Thailand, donated meals, funds and necessary supplies with 60,000 baht for children to Baan Tantawan, Foundation for Children in Nakhon Pathom province. MR.DIY Thailand joined hands with the Thai Red Cross Society to donate food, drinking water and essential items worth 100,000 baht to help flood victims across the region. MR.DIY Thailand also donated 100,000 baht to the Thai Red Cross Society to help those affected in the winter season.

During the COVID-19 outbreak, MR.DIY notably contributed 3,000 boxes of COVID-19 testing kits to the Phaya Thai Babies Home. MR.DIY held its 3rd “Giving Kindness to Children” project at SOS Children's Villages Bangpoo and Phaya Thai Babies Home by delivering a good quality of life for underprivileged children and bringing awareness of the “Back To School” campaign to ease the burden of school expenses.

=== 2023 ===
MR.DIY is also notable as a supporter of Father Ray Day Care Center and The Redemptorist Foundation for People with Disabilities with a total value of 75,000 Baht of meals, learning materials and funds.

MR.DIY donated 100,000 Baht to the National Cancer Institute.

== Awards ==
MR.DIY has been awarded the Frost & Sullivan Award in the category of Industry Leadership home decoration accessories retailer for the first time in 2020. It also managed to be selected as Market Leadership in 2020 Company of the Year in 2021 and 2022, in the home furnishings and repair industry.

MR.DIY managed to win the World Branding Awards for 5 consecutive years; 3 years for national award and 2 years for regional level. It received the prestigious award of Regional Brand of the Year Regional Award 2021 - 2022, which demonstrates the success of the brands. In addition, MR.DIY has been awarded the National Award over the past 3 years for its distinctiveness and outstanding brand in each country of MR.DIY.

In 2021, MR.DIY won “Outstanding Executive of the Year 2022” in the project of One Million Kla Good Deeds Award.

MR.DIY has been awarded the “Thailand Top Company Awards 2021” in the category of Excellence Most Potential Company Award for its successful business operations.
