= Metrojaya =

Malaysian retail company

MJ Department Stores Sdn Bhd
- Formerly: Metrojaya Berhad
- Type: Private Limited Company
- Industry: Retail
- Founded: 31 December 1974
- Headquarters: 3rd Floor Menara PMI, 2 Jalan Changkat Ceylon, 50200 Kuala Lumpur, Malaysia
- Number of locations: 4 department stores 70 specialty stores
- Products: Clothing
- Parent: MUI Group
- Divisions: Cape Cod, East India Company, Emanuelle, Laura Ashley, Living Quarters, Passages, Reject Shop, Somerset Bay, Zona
- Website: www.metrojaya.com.my

MJ Department Stores Sdn Bhd is a popular retail company in Malaysia which offers items at a medium-to-high rate. The company opened its first store at Pertama Complex, Kuala Lumpur in September, 1976, with a retail space of 18,305 sq ft (1,705 sq metres). Metrojaya's latest outlet, in Berjaya Times Square closed in December 2009, after only three years of operation. Metrojaya currently has four outlets in Malaysia namely Mid Valley Megamall, Suria Sabah, Brem Mall and LaLaport BBCC.

The Metrojaya group currently operates a chain of four department stores and more than 70 specialty stores that occupy over one million square feet of floor space, including Cape Cod, East India Company, Living Quarters, Reject Shop and Somerset Bay.

== History ==
In 1991, Sinar Kota in Kuala Lumpur and Menara Bakti at Section 14 Petaling Jaya, which were expected to be completed by that year, were pre-leased to Metrojaya.

== Retail operations ==
The company is principally involved in operating departmental stores and investment holding whilst its subsidiary companies are principally involved in property holding, investment holding as well as the operating of specialty stores and general merchandising stores. Metrojaya department stores offer a wide range of merchandise that cater to the needs and tastes of middle and high income groups. The group operates four department stores, one hypermarket store under the Cosmart name at the Bukit Jambul Complex in Penang and one "MJ by Metrojaya" Fashion Concept Store at The Curve in Mutiara Damansara.

The retail operations can be broadly classified as:

- Ladies Department (includes apparel and accessories);
- Gents Department (includes apparel and accessories);
- Juniors Department (for teens and young adults);
- Children Department;
- Homes Department (includes kitchen, bathroom, bedroom, garden);
- Cosmetics and Fragrances.

== Department stores ==
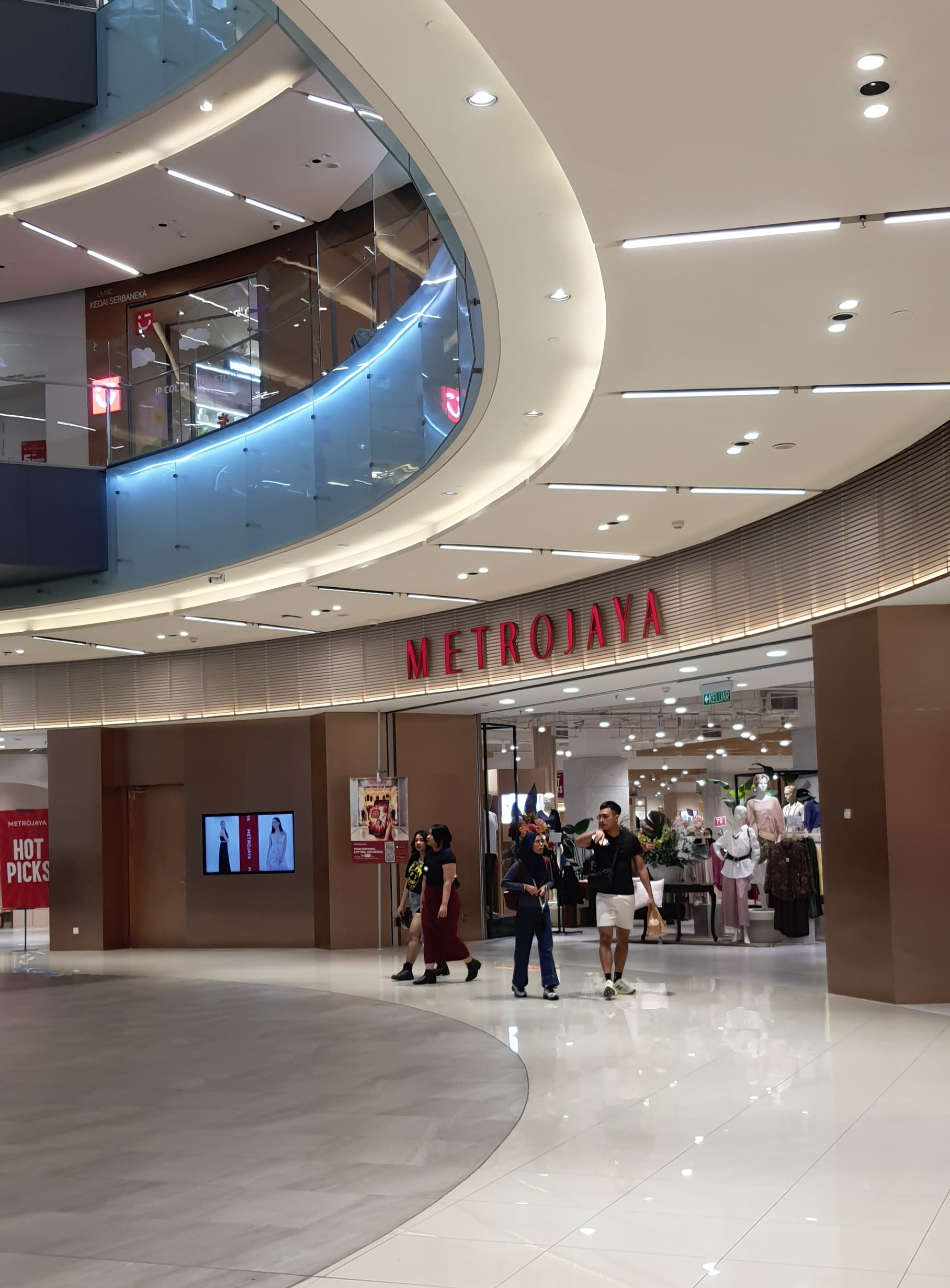
The entrance to Metrojaya department store in Lalaport Bukit Bintang City Center, Kuala Lumpur.

West Malaysia

- Brem Mall, Kepong
- Mitsui Shopping Park LaLaport BBCC, Bukit Bintang
- Mid Valley Megamall, Kuala Lumpur - closed from 27 February 2024 to 28 August 2024 for renovation and downsizing, reopened on 29 August 2024.

East Malaysia

- Suria Sabah, Kota Kinabalu - department store closed and relocated to smaller retail lot, reopened as MJ by Metrojaya in 2023

Closed

- The Curve, Mutiara Damansara (60,000 sq ft) - closed 2021
- Komtar JBCC - closed 2021
- CityOne Megamall, Kuching (130,000 sq ft) - closed 2019
- Plaza Merdeka, Kuching
- Permaisuri Imperial City Mall, Miri

== MJ Outlet ==
West Malaysia

- Ampang Point Shopping Centre, Ampang
- Mitsui Outlet Park KLIA Sepang, Sepang
