= Suria Sabah =

Shopping mall in Kota Kinabalu, Sabah, Malaysia

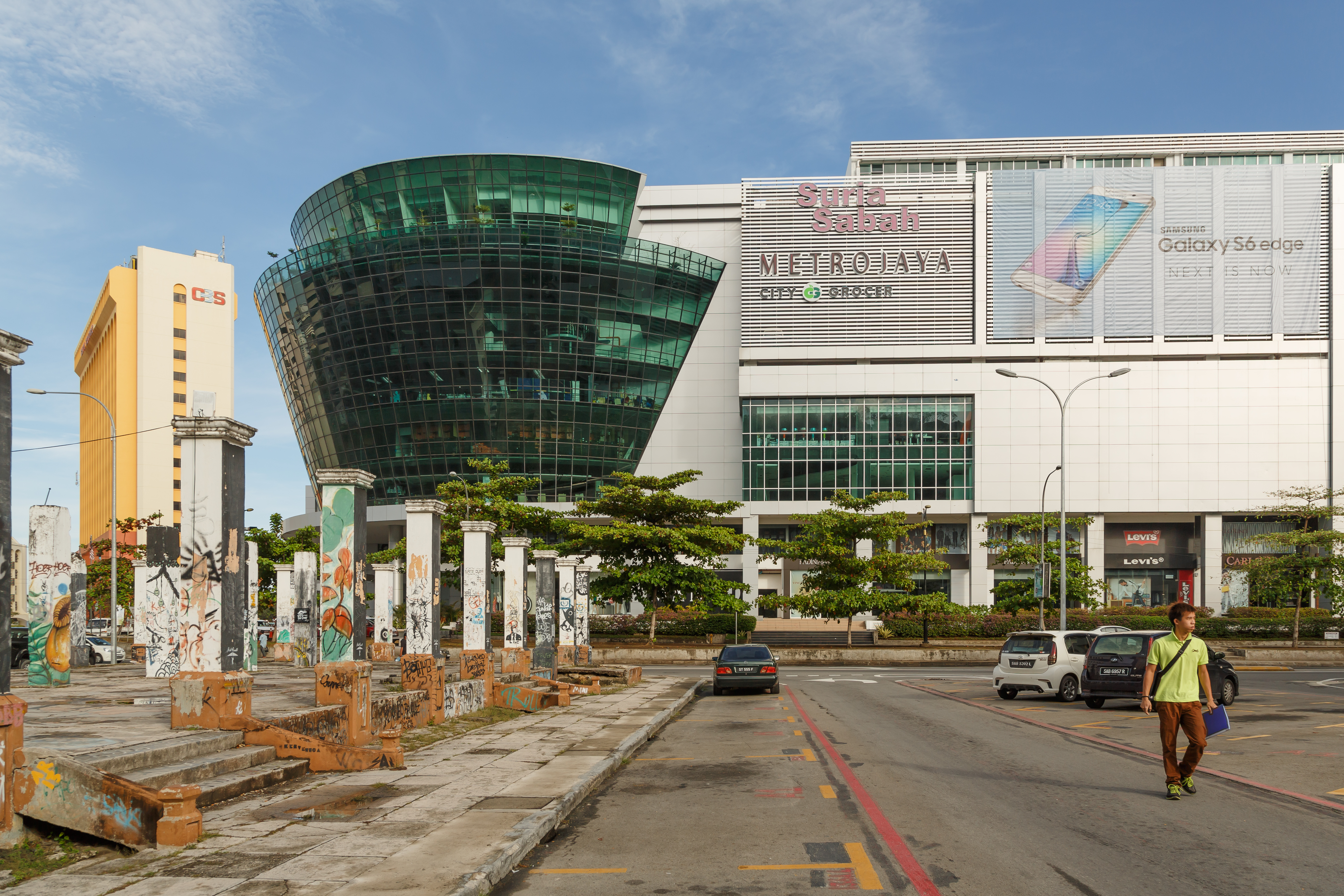
- Location: Kota Kinabalu, Sabah, Malaysia
- Coordinates: 5°59′14.69″N 116°4′37.99″E
- Address: 1, Tun Fuad Stephens Road, 88000
- Opened: July 2009
- Developer: Makamewah Sdn Bhd
- Website: www.suriasabah.com.my

Suria Sabah is a shopping centre located in the city of Kota Kinabalu, Sabah, Malaysia. Completed in July 2009, the mall sits on an 11-acre site facing the South China Sea with a scenic view of the Tunku Abdul Rahman National Park.

== See also ==
- List of shopping malls in Malaysia
