= Nojima =

Nojima (written: 野島 or 野嶋) is a Japanese surname. Notable people with the surname include:

- Akio Nojima (野島 昭生; born 1945), Japanese voice actor
- Hirofumi Nojima (野島 裕史; born 1973), Japanese voice actor
- Kazushige Nojima (野島 一成; born 1964), Japanese video game writer
- Kenji Nojima (野島 健児; born 1976), Japanese voice actor
- Masahiro Nojima (野島 正弘; born 1971), Japanese baseball player
- Minoru Nojima (野島 稔; born 1945), Japanese classical pianist
- Ryo Nojima (野嶋 良; born 1979), Japanese footballer
- Shinji Nojima (野島 伸司; born 1963), Japanese screenwriter
- Sakura Nojima (野島さくら; born 25 April 1999), Japanese footballer
- Taiji Nojima (野島 泰治; 1896–1970), Japanese dermatologist
- Yasuzō Nojima (野島 康三; 1889–1964), Japanese photographer

== See also ==
- Nojima Corporation, a Japanese consumer electronics company
- Nojima Fault, a seismic fault
