= Nitori =

Japanese furniture retailer

Nitori Co., Ltd

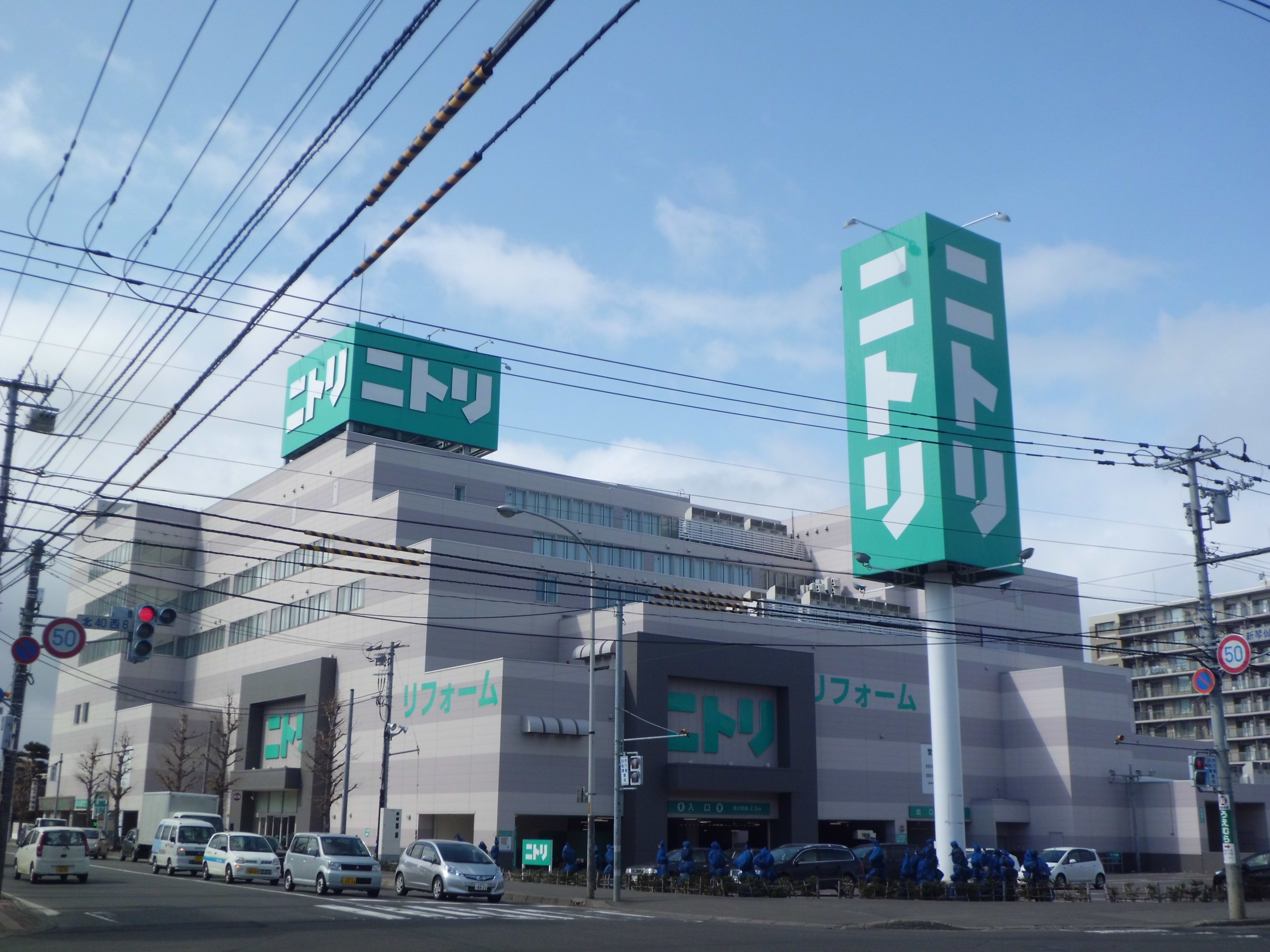
- Nitori headquarters in Asabu, Kita Ward, Sapporo
- Native name: 株式会社ニトリ
- Industry: Retail
- Founded: 1967; 59 years ago in Sapporo, Japan
- Headquarters: Sapporo, Japan
- Number of locations: 900+ stores
- Area served: Worldwide
- Key people: Akio Nitori (founder and president)
- Products: Furniture; Homeware
- Website: www.nitori-net.jp

Nitori Co., Ltd is a Japanese furniture and home accessories retail company headquartered in Sapporo. The company is the largest furniture and home furnishing chain in Japan.

Nitori was founded in Sapporo in 1967, by the company's current President, Akio Nitori. Nitori currently has more than 700 stores in Japan and more than 70 stores in China, and more than 50 stores in other Asian countries. The company's products are sold in the United States under the Aki-Home brand name.

In November 2010, Nitori Holdings, Inc. was established as a wholly owned subsidiary of Nitori Holdings (holding company) following the transition to a holding company structure, which was established in 2012 and began operating stores under the name "AKi-Home" (after Akio's name) the following year.

Nitori was ranked the #1 most desirable company to work for among new graduates in 2023 and 2024.

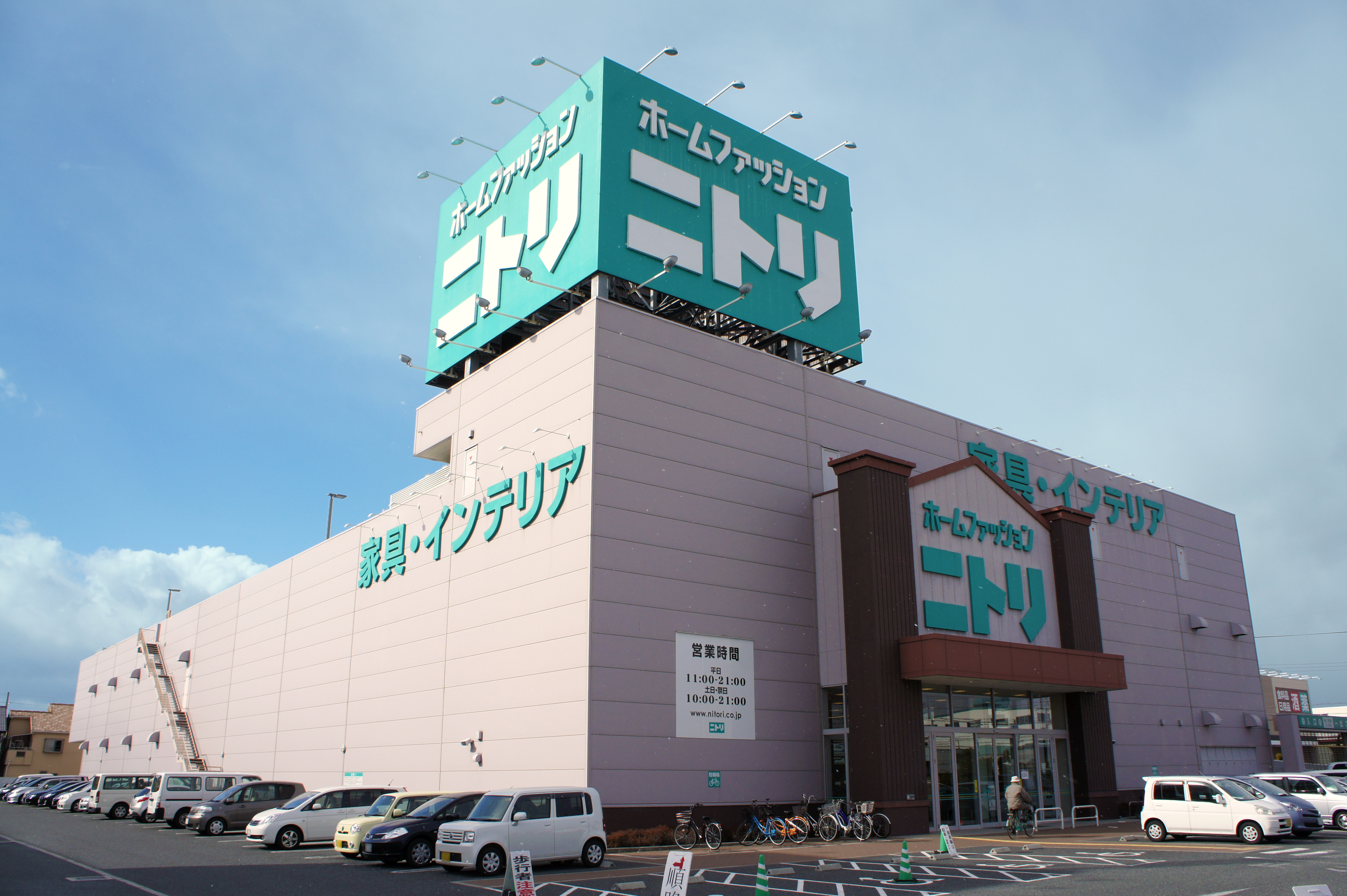
Nitori store in Takatsuki, Osaka

== Controversies ==
In February 2024, Nitori along with 4 other firms were ordered by the Consumer Affairs Agency to take reformative action under consumer labelling laws. Nitori had falsely advertised that a rice cooker had the ability to cut 33～59% of total carbs through a cooking process that separates starches. Nitori released a statement vowing to "honestly accept [the order] and prevent reoccurences."

In 2021, Nitori ordered a recall of diatomaceous earth coasters and bathmats over asbestos contamination. The recall affected 18 SKUs and 2,870,000 total products sold from December 2016 to December 2020. A similar recall also affected hardware store giant Cainz.
