= MR.DIY =

Malaysian variety store chain

- Logo used since 2009
- Industry: Retail
- Founded: 28 July 2005; 21 years ago
- Founder: Tan Yu Yeh
- Headquarters: Seri Kembangan, Selangor, Malaysia
- Number of locations: 6,000+ (August 2026)
- Area served: Malaysia; Brunei; Thailand; Indonesia; Philippines; Singapore; India; Cambodia; Turkey; Spain; Vietnam; Bangladesh; Poland; South Africa; Romania
- Products: Home improvement products; General merchandise; Household goods; Hardware; Electrical goods; Toys; Stationery; Automotive accessories
- Brands: MR.DIY; MR.DIY Express; MR.DIY Plus; MR.TOY; MR.DOLLAR
- Owners: Tan Yu Yeh; Tan Yu Wei
- Website: www.mrdiy.com

MR.DIY, stylised as MR.D.I.Y., is a Malaysian multinational discount variety store chain offering home improvement products and general merchandise. Founded in Kuala Lumpur in 2005 by Tan Yu Yeh, the business was joined by his younger brother Tan Yu Wei in 2011. It sells a broad range of hardware, household and furnishing products, electrical goods, stationery and sporting goods, toys, car accessories, gifts, computer and mobile phone accessories, jewellery and cosmetics. Most stores have an average floor area of around 10,000 sq ft (930 m^{2}) and carry more than 17,000 product varieties. As of August 2026, the wider MR.DIY network comprised more than 6,000 stores across 15 countries.

The MR.DIY network is organised through several related corporate groups associated with founder Tan Yu Yeh and his brother Tan Yu Wei. Its Malaysian and Bruneian operations are conducted by Mr D.I.Y. Group (M) Berhad (MDGM), a public company listed on Bursa Malaysia, which was designated as their flagship retail company for those two markets. Outside Malaysia and Brunei, much of the network is held through Mr D.I.Y. International Holding Ltd. (MDIH), Mr D.I.Y. International Holding Two Ltd. (MDIH 2), and their locally incorporated holding and operating companies. Tan Yu Yeh and Tan Yu Wei are substantial shareholders of MDIH, while MDIH is an affiliate of MDGM. The international businesses form part of the wider MR.DIY network through common ownership and corporate links, but sit outside MDGM's consolidated Malaysian-listed group.

As of 31 December 2025, MDGM operated 1,556 stores in Malaysia and Brunei and recorded revenue of RM4.954 billion and net profit of RM632.7 million. The wider international network includes separately listed businesses on the Indonesia Stock Exchange and Stock Exchange of Thailand.

== History ==
=== Malaysia and Brunei ===
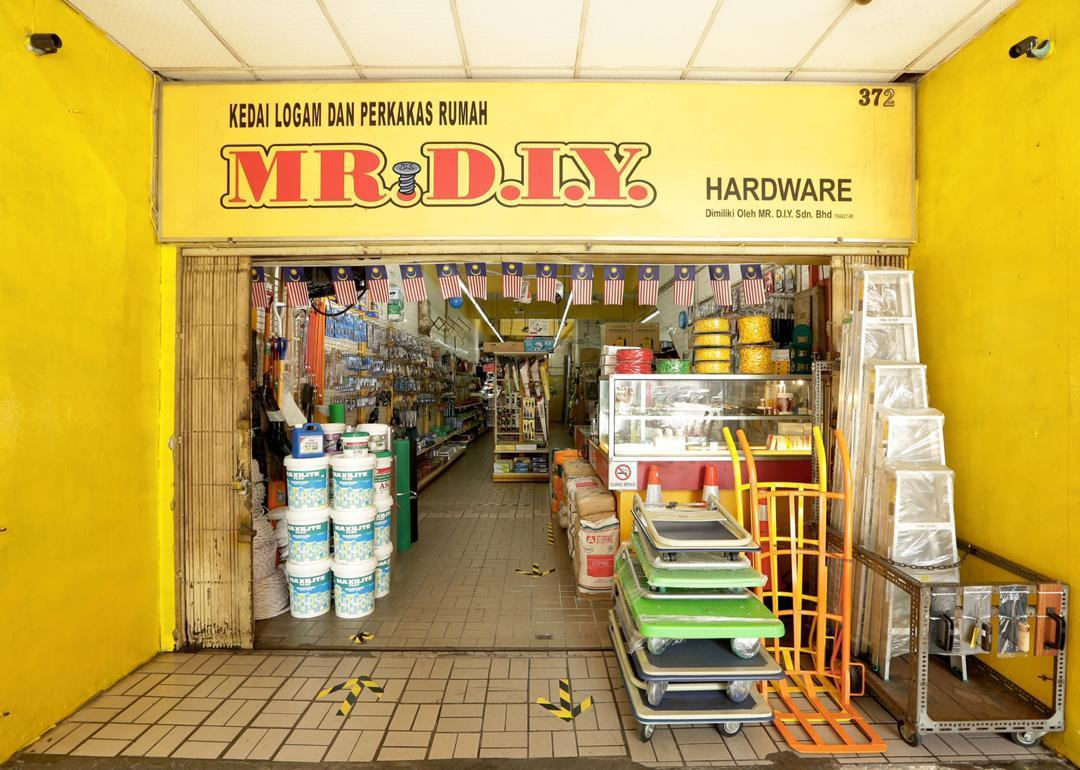
MR.DIY's first store on Jalan Tuanku Abdul Rahman in Kuala Lumpur, opened in 2005.

MR.DIY began in July 2005 as a single consumer hardware store on Jalan Tuanku Abdul Rahman in Kuala Lumpur. By the end of its first year, it had expanded to three outlets.

The chain expanded into shopping centres in 2009, opening its first outlet in an AEON shopping centre at Taman Equine, Selangor. Its first store within a Tesco outlet opened at Setia Alam in 2010.

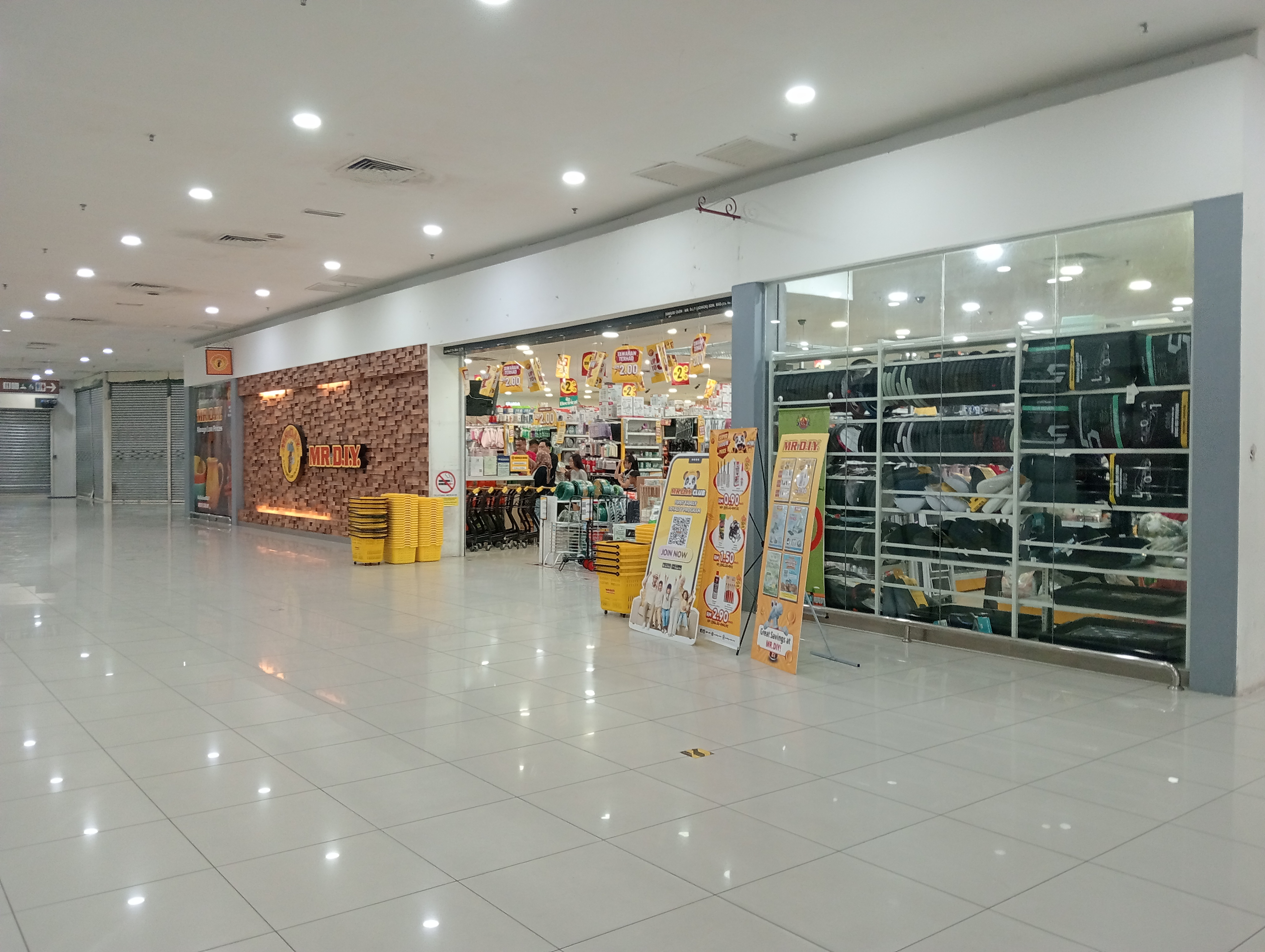
An MR.DIY store at AEON BIG Kluang in Johor.

In 2014, MR.DIY opened its first store in East Malaysia at 1 Borneo Hypermall in Kota Kinabalu, Sabah. The following year, it entered Brunei with a store at Plaza Abdul Razak in Bandar Seri Begawan.

The chain reached 250 Malaysian stores in 2017 and launched its dedicated e-commerce website and a flagship store at Mid Valley Megamall in 2018. In 2019, it introduced the MR.TOY retail format, followed by MR.DOLLAR in 2020.

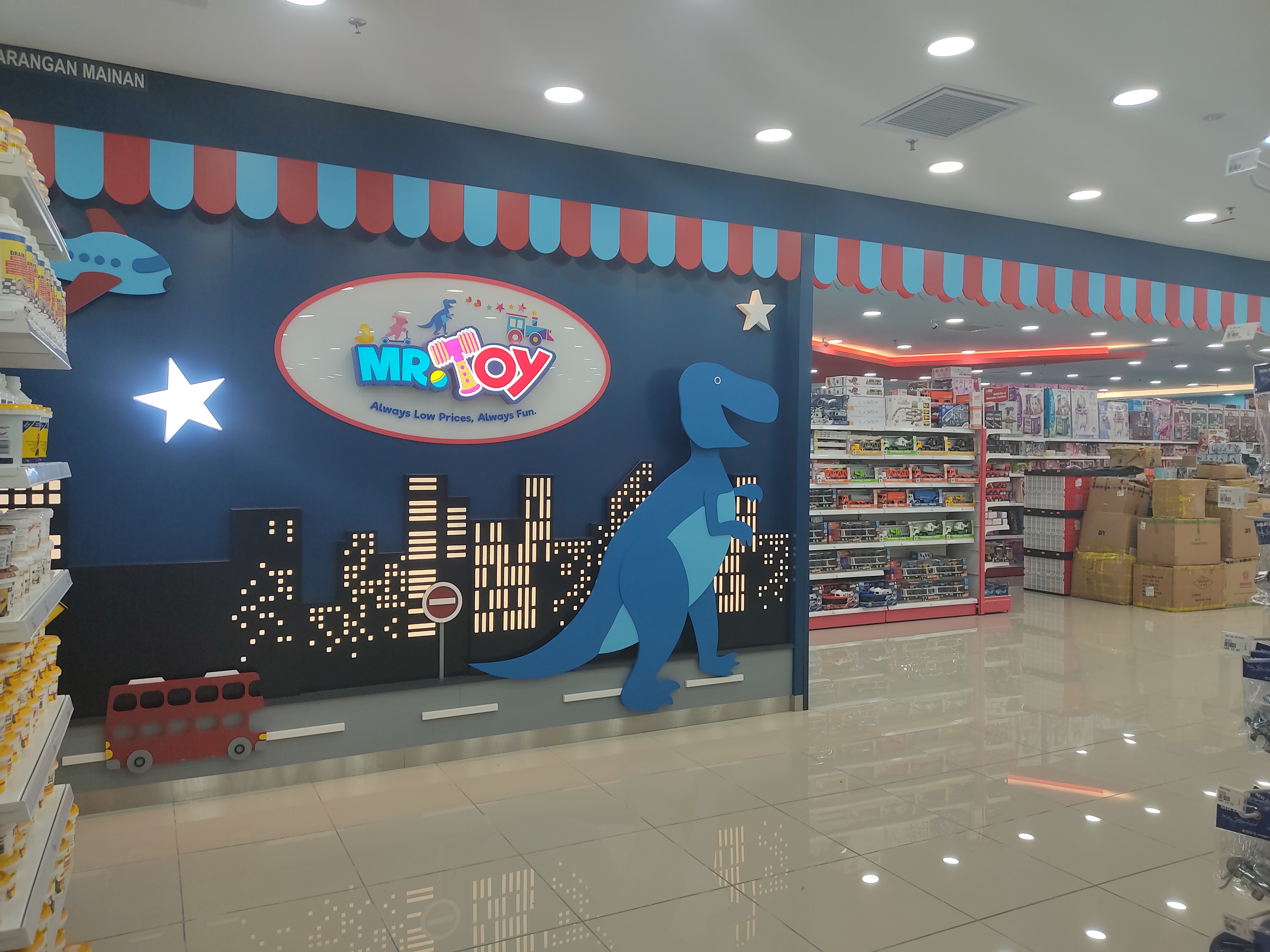
An MR.TOY outlet at NU Sentral in Kuala Lumpur.

In October 2020, Mr D.I.Y. Group became publicly traded on the Main Market of Bursa Malaysia. Its initial public offering raised about RM1.5 billion and was Malaysia's largest IPO in three years.

In April 2021, the group introduced MR.DIY Express, a smaller-format concept intended to extend the chain into more easily accessible locations, including rural communities.

In January 2022, MR.DIY opened its 800th store at Pavilion Bukit Jalil. The 18,000 sq ft (1,700 m^{2}) outlet stocked approximately 18,000 products. Later that year, the group introduced MR.DIY Plus at Mid Valley Megamall, a larger-format store combining products from MR.DIY, MR.TOY and MR.DOLLAR.

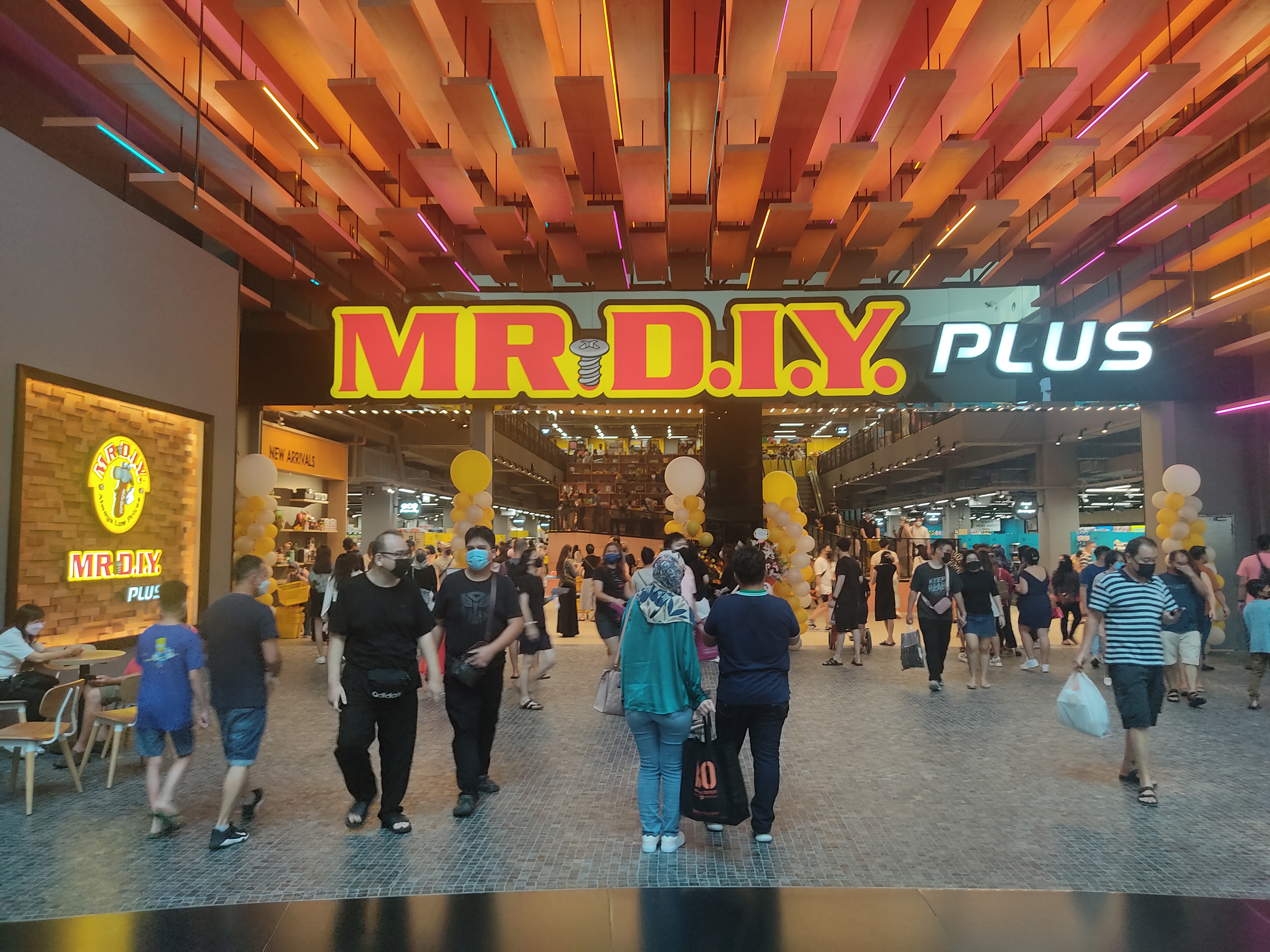
The first MR.DIY Plus store at Mid Valley Megamall in Kuala Lumpur, a three-in-one concept combining MR.DIY, MR.TOY and MR.DOLLAR merchandise.

The group ended 2022 with 1,080 stores in Malaysia and Brunei. Its 1,000th MR.DIY-branded store opened at Taman Sejahtera in Sik, Kedah, in 2023. The overall network increased to 1,255 stores at the end of 2023 and 1,429 at the end of 2024.

== International network ==
Outside Malaysia and Brunei, much of the MR.DIY network is organised through companies held by Mr D.I.Y. International Holding Ltd. (MDIH) and Mr D.I.Y. International Holding Two Ltd. (MDIH 2). The two companies are investment holding vehicles for retail businesses similar to MDGM in Singapore, the Philippines, Indonesia, Spain, India, Thailand, Cambodia, Laos, Turkey, Vietnam, Bangladesh and Poland, and have also been used for expansion into Greece, Bulgaria, Romania and South Africa.

MDIH and MDGM are affiliated through common ownership and management links. MR.DIY founder Tan Yu Yeh and his brother Tan Yu Wei are substantial shareholders of MDIH and designated MDGM as their flagship for home improvement, general merchandise, toys and grocery retailing in Malaysia and Brunei. MDGM also provides services to companies within the international network, including merchandise procurement, supplier negotiations, logistics management and other shared functions. The international operations are nevertheless held outside MDGM and are not included in the consolidated financial results of the Malaysian-listed company.

The brand entered Thailand in 2016 and Indonesia in 2017, followed by the Philippines and Singapore in 2018, and India and Cambodia in 2019. MR.DIY entered Europe through Turkey in 2021 and Spain in 2022, followed by Vietnam in 2023 and Bangladesh and Poland in 2024. The network subsequently expanded into South Africa in 2025 and Romania in 2026.

=== Store network by country ===
The following table lists the markets in the wider MR.DIY network, the year in which the brand entered each market, and the number of stores listed on MR.DIY's global website as of August 2026.

Country	Entry	Stores
Malaysia	2005	1,544
Brunei	2015	11
Thailand	2016	1,265
Indonesia	2017	1,367
Philippines	2018	1,058
Singapore	2018	13
India	2019	447
Cambodia	2019	7
Turkey	2021	178
Spain	2022	25
Vietnam	2023	72
Bangladesh	2024	18
Poland	2024	35
South Africa	2025	7
Romania	2026	5

=== Indonesia ===
MR.DIY began operating in Indonesia in 2017. The Indonesian business is operated through PT Daya Intiguna Yasa Tbk (MDIY), which is legally separate from Mr D.I.Y. Group (M) Berhad.

PT Daya Intiguna Yasa was listed on the Indonesia Stock Exchange on 19 December 2024. Its initial public offering involved approximately 2.52 billion shares, equivalent to 10% of its post-offering share capital, at Rp1,650 per share. Approximately 2.27 billion of the shares were existing shares sold by Azara Alpina Sdn Bhd, while about 251.9 million were newly issued shares.

By the end of 2025, the Indonesian company operated 1,226 stores nationwide. Investment research firm RHB described it as an affordable, broad-range home improvement and lifestyle retailer carrying around 18,000 stock-keeping units per store.

=== Thailand ===
MR.DIY entered Thailand in 2016. The Thai business is operated by MR. D.I.Y. Holding (Thailand) Public Company Limited, a holding company for the country's MR.DIY retail operations. By the end of 2024, the company operated 932 stores across 74 of Thailand's 77 provinces. It reached 1,000 stores nationwide in May 2025.

MR. D.I.Y. Holding (Thailand) was listed on the Stock Exchange of Thailand on 5 November 2025 under the ticker MRDIYT. The initial public offering comprised 655 million shares at ฿8.60 per share, including 420 million newly issued shares and 235 million existing shares sold by MDIH (Singapore) Pte. Ltd. The offering raised approximately ฿5.6 billion and was the largest Thai IPO of 2025.

At the time of listing, the company operated 1,027 stores across all 77 provinces and sold more than 16,000 products across six principal categories. Its major shareholders include MR. D.I.Y. Co., Ltd., MDIH (Singapore) Pte. Ltd., Tan Yu Yeh and Tan Yu Wei.

== Store formats and merchandise ==
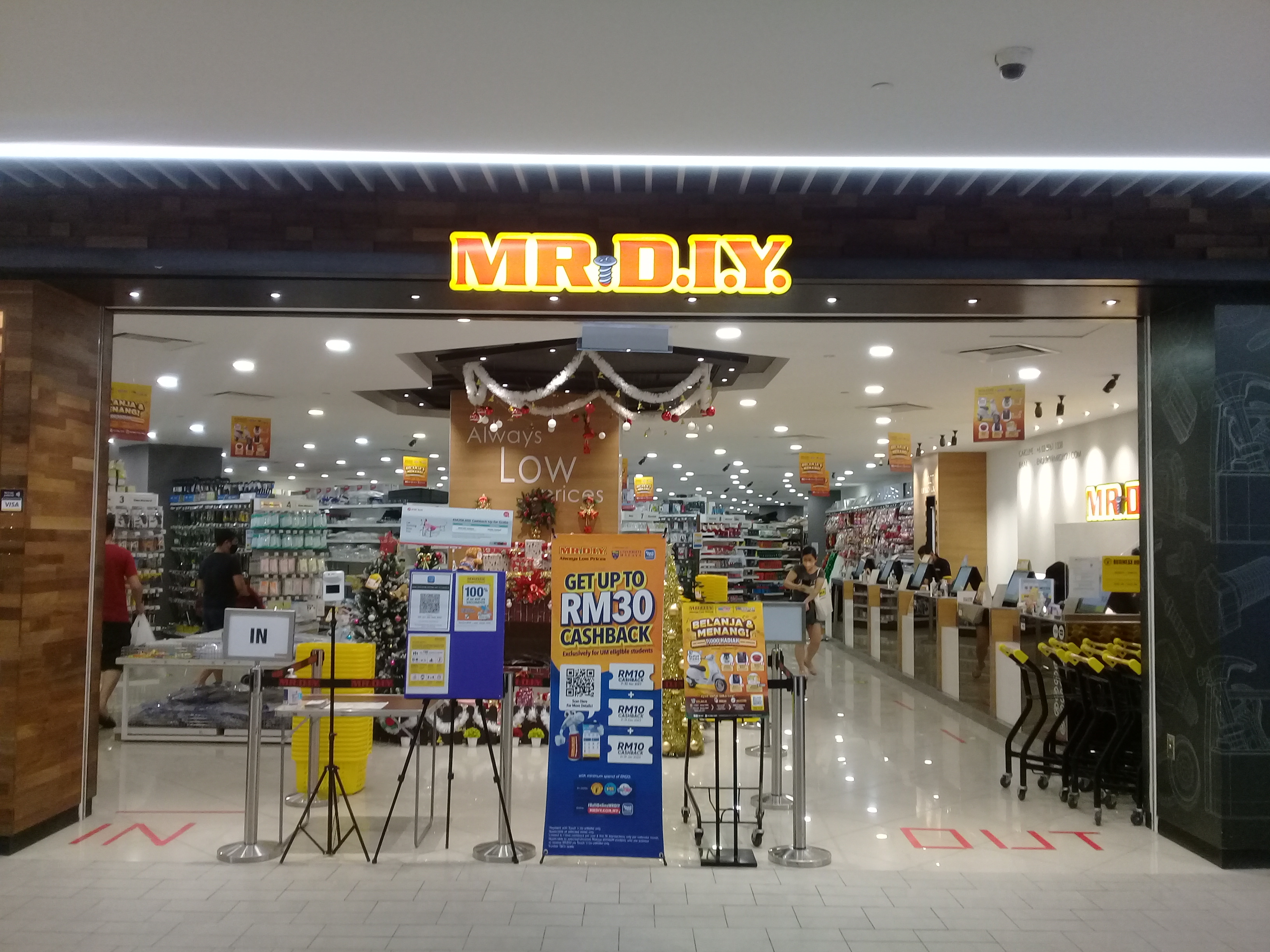
An MR.DIY store at 1 Utama in Bandar Utama, Selangor.

MR.DIY operates several retail formats aimed at different store sizes and customer segments. Its product range spans hardware, household and furnishing products, electrical goods, stationery and sporting goods, toys, gifts, car accessories, computer and mobile accessories, jewellery and cosmetics.

The principal formats are:

- MR.DIY – the main home improvement and general merchandise format.
- MR.DIY Express – a smaller-format store designed for convenient locations, including smaller towns and rural communities.
- MR.DIY Plus – a larger store format combining products from MR.DIY, MR.TOY and MR.DOLLAR.
- MR.TOY – a specialist toy retail format introduced in 2019.
- MR.DOLLAR – a value-oriented general merchandise format introduced in 2020. The concept is based on the dollar-store model and sells household goods, food and beverages and other low-priced merchandise.

The company's broad assortment and value-oriented format place MR.DIY partly within the general merchandise and variety-store segment rather than solely within conventional DIY retailing. RAM Ratings classifies the Malaysian group as a home improvement and general merchandise retailer, while DIY International has noted that its European stores carry more general merchandise than a conventional DIY chain.

== Financials ==
The following figures refer to Mr D.I.Y. Group (M) Berhad (MDGM), the Malaysian-listed company, and its consolidated operations in Malaysia and Brunei.

Selected financial and store data
Year	Revenue (RM million)	Net profit (RM million)	Number of stores
2017	1,229	210	354
2018	1,771	308	467
2019	2,276	318	593
2020	2,559	337	734
2021	3,373	432	900
2022	3,986	473	1,080
2023	4,359	561	1,255
2024	4,651	569	1,429
2025	4,954	633	1,556
