= Yayasan =

Yayasan may refer to:

- Kolej Yayasan Saad (KYS), a private, fully residential school at Ayer Keroh, Melaka, Malaysia
- Kolej Yayasan UEM, residential college situated in Lembah Beringin, Selangor, Malaysia
- Yayasan Al-Bukhari Mosque, in Kuala Lumpur, Malaysia
- Yayasan Kemanusiaan Ibu Pertiwi, Indonesian Non Profit Organisation dedicated to health and education programs for the needy in Bali
- Yayasan Mohammad Noah Mosque, in Genting Highlands, Pahang
- Yayasan Senang Hati, non-profit organization in Bali that assists people living with disabilities
- Yayasan Senyum (Smile Foundation), a non-profit organisation in Bali that helps people with craniofacial disabilities
