= Kenanga Wholesale City =

Coordinates: 3°08′N 101°43′E

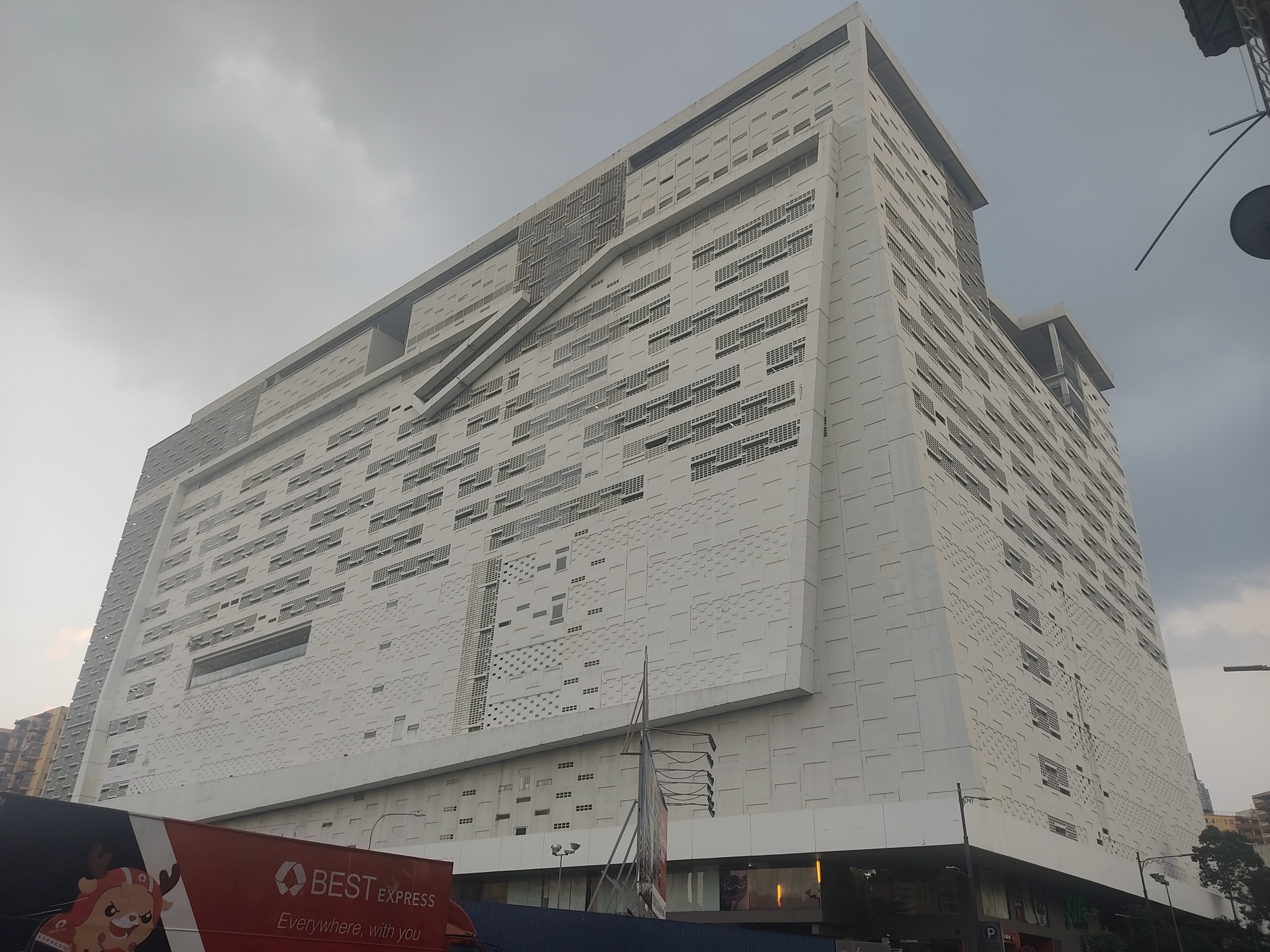
- Location: Pudu, Kuala Lumpur, Malaysia
- Opened: 20 October 2011
- Developer: Kha Seng Group (DBA Kenanga Wholesale City Sdn Bhd)
- Manager: Kha Seng Group (DBA Kenanga Wholesale City Sdn Bhd)
- Architect: zlgdesign
- Num. of stores: 800 (lots)
- Floor area: 500,000 sq ft (46,000 m^{2})
- Floors: 17
- Parking: Over 1,800 parking spaces
- Public transit: AG9 SP9 MR4 BBCC-Hang Tuah station AG10 SP10 Pudu LRT station
- Website: kenangacity.com.my

Kenanga Wholesale City (also known as KWC Fashion Mall), is Malaysia's first fashion wholesale mall. It is located in Pudu, the heart of Kuala Lumpur, a few minutes from the city's Golden Triangle, in the fashion wholesale area of Jalan Kenanga.

KWC Fashion Mall has 500,000 square feet (46,000 m^{2}) of net lettable space and houses more than 800 wholesale and retail shops as well as boutiques selling a range of fashion-related merchandise including women's, men's and children's apparel, accessories, shoes and leather goods.

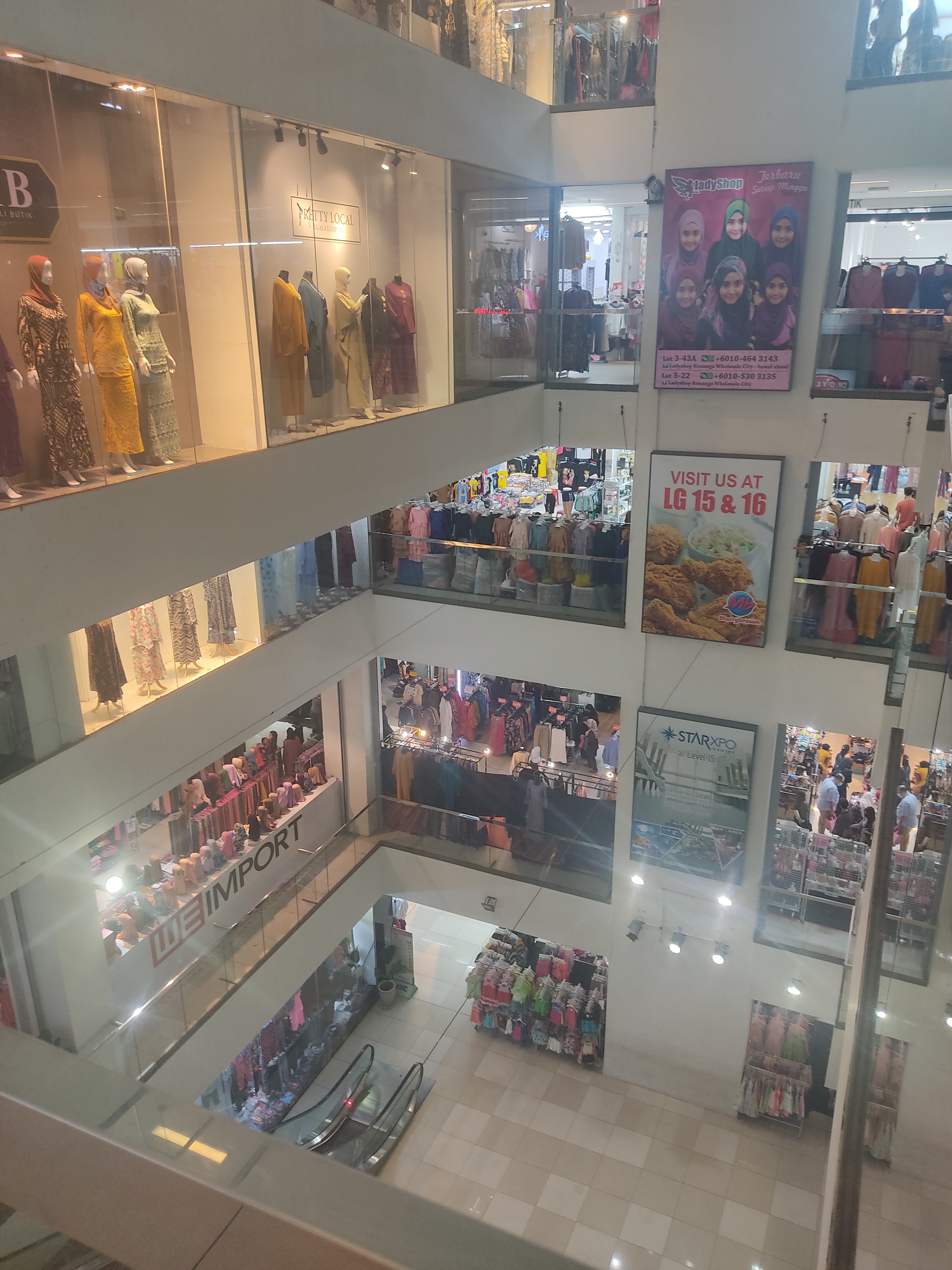
Interior of the mall

Starstage@KWC is a 20,000 square feet (1,900 m^{2}) purpose-built concert hall and event space located at Level 15 of the mall. It had hosted several concerts and events such as Indonesian pop-rock band Ungu “Tercipta Untukku” Live in Malaysia in February 2014, Korean actor Lee Kwang Soo Fan Meeting in January 2014, Korean actor and singer Lee Min Ho Concert in June 2013, Malaysian International Gourmet Festival (MGIF) in November 2013, TVBStar Awards Malaysia in December 2013 and Mandopop boy band Super Junior M in 2012.

KWC Fashion Mall is endorsed by Tourism Malaysia as a Kuala Lumpur Must Visit Destination.

The Grand Opening of KWC Fashion Mall took place on 26 May 2012, with Korean superstar band Block B, Malaysian rock band Hujan and other big names from entertainment and fashion in attendance.

== Transportation ==
The shopping mall is accessible within walking distance southwest of Hang Tuah Station.

== See also ==
- List of shopping malls in Malaysia
