= William Broyles Jr. =

American journalist and screenwriter (born 1944)

- Born: William Dodson Broyles Jr. October 8, 1944 (age 82); Houston, Texas, U.S.
- Education: Rice University (BA); University of Oxford (MA)
- Occupations: Journalist; screenwriter
- Years active: 1968–2018
- Spouses: Linda Purl (m. 1988; div. 1992): Sybil Ann Newman; Andrea Bettina Berndt
- Children: 4

William Dodson Broyles Jr. (born October 8, 1944) is an American journalist, screenwriter and former United States Marine Corps officer.

He created the television series China Beach (1988–91) and Six (2017–18), and wrote such films as Apollo 13 (1995), Cast Away (2000), Planet of the Apes (2001), Unfaithful (2002), The Polar Express (2004), Jarhead (2005) and Flags of Our Fathers (2006). His work on Apollo 13 earned him an Academy Award nomination for Best Adapted Screenplay.

Broyles co-founded Texas Monthly magazine, and served as editor of Newsweek from 1982 to 1984.

== Early life ==
Broyles was born in Houston, Texas, the son of Elizabeth (née Bills) and William Dodson Broyles. He was raised in Baytown, Texas, graduated from Robert E. Lee High School and attended Rice University, earning a B.A. degree in History in 1966.

After graduating from Rice, Broyles studied as a Marshall Scholar at Oxford University where he earned an M.A. degree in Politics, Philosophy, and Economics in 1968. While at Oxford, Broyles pursued his interests in both journalism and public service. He wrote political columns for the Oxford University magazine and contributed articles to The Economist magazine of London.

== Military career ==
In 1968, Broyles's career was put on hold when he enlisted into the United States Marine Corps. Between 1969 and 1971, he rose to the rank of First Lieutenant and served in Vietnam, first as an infantry platoon commander, and later as an aide-de-camp to the Assistant Division Commander, 1st Marine Division.

Broyles's experiences in Vietnam inspired two of his projects. In 1984, he was one of the first veterans to return to Vietnam, and his book Brothers in Arms: A Journey from War to Peace, recounts his visit and his impressions of the aftermath of war on himself and his fellow Marines, as well as on the country he fought against in battle.

In 1988, Broyles once again drew upon his memories in Vietnam when he co-created the award-winning television series, China Beach, a weekly drama for ABC about the doctors and nurses stationed at an American military base in Danang. Broyles also authored an article in Esquire "Why Men Love War".

== Journalist ==
Upon returning from Vietnam in 1971, Broyles picked up his professional career. He taught Philosophy and Political Science at the United States Naval Academy in Annapolis before returning to Texas as Chief Public Relations Officer for the Houston Independent School District He became the founding editor of Texas Monthly magazine in 1972.

== Screenwriter ==
Broyles turned his attention from television projects to writing feature films. He shares his first screenwriting credit with former Texas Monthly writer Al Reinert for Apollo 13. The film, based loosely on the book Lost Moon, co-authored by astronaut Jim Lovell and Jeffrey Kluger, was directed by Ron Howard.

After Apollo 13, Broyles began work on Cast Away, an original screenplay about a FedEx engineer stranded on a deserted island.

Other writing credits in motion pictures include Entrapment (1999), Planet of the Apes (2001), Unfaithful (2002), The Polar Express (2004), Jarhead (2005), and Flags of Our Fathers (2006). He also assisted in the screenplay of Saving Private Ryan, though he was uncredited.

== Personal life ==
On November 5, 1988, Broyles married actress Linda Purl. They later divorced. His second wife was Sybil Ann Newman, with whom he had two children. He married, thirdly, to Andrea Bettina Berndt. They have two daughters. Broyles was recognized with a Lifetime Achievement Award from the Texas Institute of Letters in April 2026, in College Station, Texas.

== Filmography ==
Year	Film	Credit	Notes
1991	Under Cover	Written by, executive producer	TV movie
1991	Before the Storm	Executive producer	TV movie
1995	Apollo 13	Screenplay by	Co-wrote with Al Reinert
1999	Entrapment	Screenplay by	Co-wrote screenplay with Ron Bass, based on a story by Ron Bass and Michael Hertzberg; as William Broyles
2000	Cast Away	Written by	
2001	Planet of the Apes	Screenplay by	Co-wrote with Lawrence Konner & Mark Rosenthal
2002	Unfaithful	Screenplay by	Co-wrote with Alvin Sargent
2004	The Polar Express	Screenplay by	Co-wrote with Robert Zemeckis
2005	Jarhead	Screenplay by	As William D. Broyles Jr.
2006	Flags of our Fathers	Screenplay by	Co-wrote with Paul Haggis
2015	McFarland, USA	Uncredited rewrite	

== See also ==
- Wilson the Volleyball

== Archival sources ==
- The William Broyles Jr. Papers 1962–2002 (106 linear feet) are housed at the Wittliff Collections, Texas State University in San Marcos.
