= Tung Shin Hospital =

Coordinates: 3.145797°N 101.703647°E

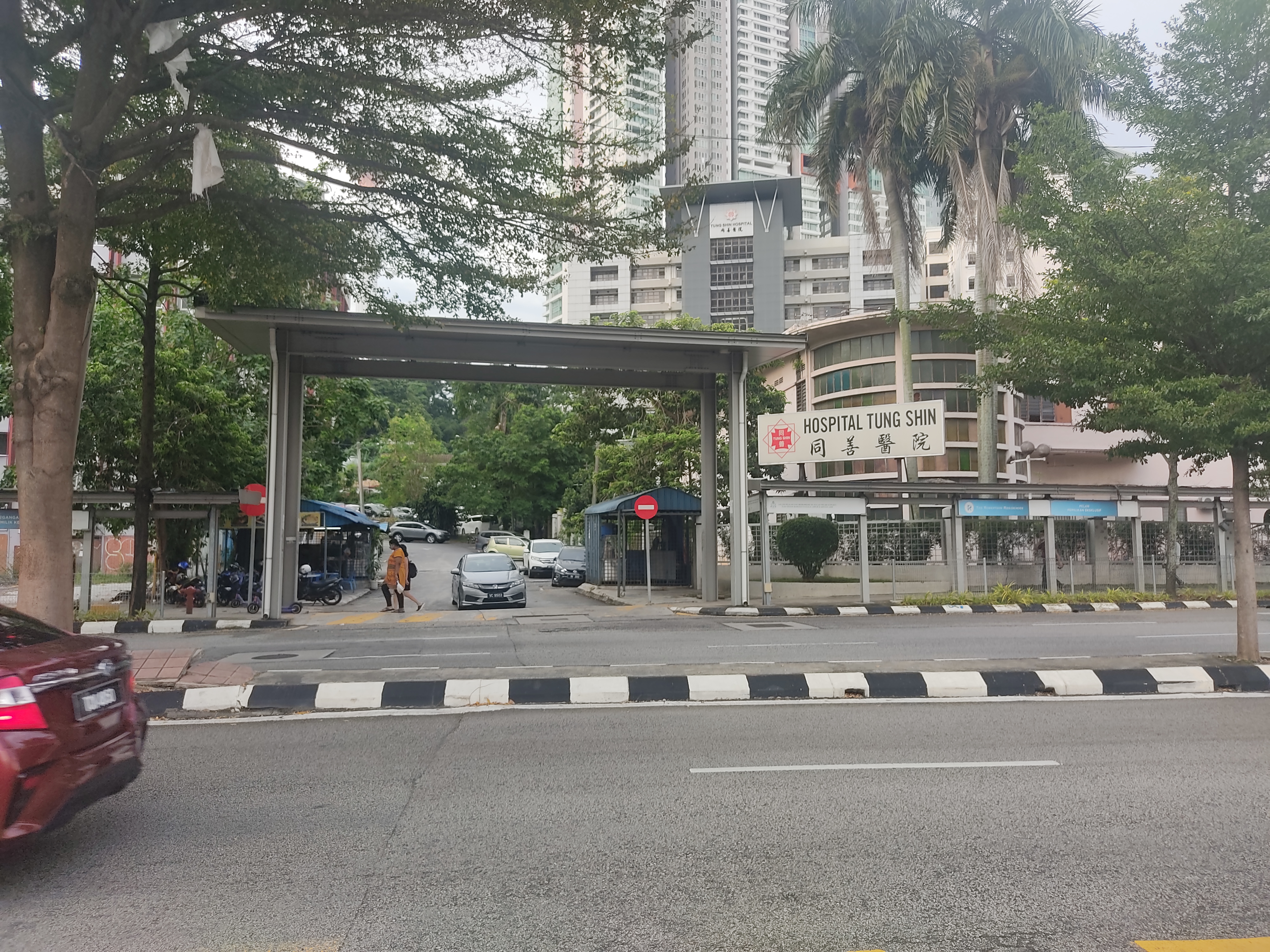

Geography
- Location: Jalan Pudu, Kuala Lumpur, Malaysia

Organisation
- Care system: Private
- Type: General
- Affiliated university: Tung Shin Academy Of Nursing

Services
- Emergency department: Yes
- Beds: 157 (Western Medical); 64 (Chinese Medical); 221 (Total)

History
- Opened: 1881

Links
- Website: www.tungshin.com.my

Tung Shin Hospital
- Simplified Chinese: 同善医院
- Traditional Chinese: 同善醫院
Transcriptions
Standard Mandarin
- Hanyu Pinyin: Tóngshàn Yīyuàn

Tung Shin Hospital (simplified Chinese: 同善医院; traditional Chinese: 同善醫院; pinyin: Tóngshàn Yīyuàn), formerly known as Pooi Shin Thong, is a 221-bed tertiary acute care hospital in Jalan Pudu, Kuala Lumpur, Malaysia established by Kapitan Yap Kwan Seng. The not-for-profit private hospital is accredited by the Malaysian Society for Quality in Health. It started as a provider of Traditional Chinese Medicine treatment in 1881, later it was called the Tung Shin Hospital from 1894 as it was converted to a non-profit organisation, the Western Medicine division commenced operations in 1985. Additional buildings and renovations were made in 1917 - with prominent tycoon Cheong Yoke Choy donating a large sum to the hospital to build a new single-storey ward building, which was what was then Ward 1 - and again between 1959 and the early 1960s.

It owns and operates Tung Shin Academy of Nursing, a private nursing college located in Pudu, Kuala Lumpur, Malaysia.

== See also ==
- Healthcare in Malaysia
- Tung Shin Academy of Nursing
