= SP9 =

SP9 may refer to:

- BBCC–Hang Tuah station, Kuala Lumpur, Malaysia; by Rapid Rail station code
- USS Psyche V (SP-9), an armed motorboat that served in the United States Navy as a patrol vessel from 1917 to 1919
- 3601 Velikhov (1979 SP9), an outer main-belt asteroid discovered on September 22, 1979
