= David Magson =

David William Magson (born 4 May 1945) is a businessman, who was awarded the MBE in 2003 for his contribution to the recovery effort which followed the first terrorist bombing in Bali in 2002 in which more than 200 people, both Indonesians and visitors, lost their lives. Immediately following the bombing, Magson assisted wounded Australians to evacuate and then worked in the morgue for four days on behalf of the British Consul.

Magson witnessed the devastation and social upheaval which affected the people of Bali after the bombing and readily accepted the role of chair of YKIP (Yayasan Kemanusiaan Ibu Pertiwi, or the Humanitarian Foundation for Mother Earth), which was established to help the needy in Bali through health and education programs.

Established only days after the Bali bomb blast of October 12, 2002, YKIP is intended as a living tribute to the 222 dead and 446 injured victims of the two blasts. YKIP is a donor agency for other organizations to support projects on Bali, knowing that their funds will be used in a productive and transparent manner. YKIP also has its own projects, including the KEMBALI Scholarship program; KIDS scholarship program for the Bali bomb survivors; Vocational Scholarship Program and the University Scholarship Program.

David Magson held the chairperson’s position from 2003 until 2008. Through the company of which he was Chairman, Mitrais, he continues to provide support for YKIP in the form of serviced office space, volunteer webmasters and IT support. (See YKIP's JOURNEY: The first five years, published by YKIP, 2007, page 10.; also www.ykip.org/about-us and www.ykip.org/boards-staff).

He holds dual Australian and British citizenship. A mathematician by training, he is a member of the Australian Institute of Company Directors, and a former Fellow of the Australian Institute of Mining and Metallurgy.

Prior to moving to Southeast Asia, he spent more than 20 years in the mining industry, working in the UK, Africa, and Australia. He currently lives in Perth, Western Australia.

Magson is currently the CEO of Ksatria Pty. Ltd. and a Board Member of MediRecords Pty. Ltd. He is also a past chairperson of Mitrais Pte. Ltd. , the Bali International School, Oniqua Pty Ltd, and Auslang International Pty Ltd and a founding Vice President of the Australian Indonesian Business Council (Bali).
