= Michael Hertzberg =

American film producer

- Occupation: Film producer

Michael Hertzberg is an American assistant director, writer, and film producer best known for his work with director Mel Brooks.

== Biography ==
Hertzberg was extremely influential on Brooks, having started working for Brooks as an assistant director on Brook's first film The Producers, and going on to produce several of Brooks' early films including box office hits, Blazing Saddles and Silent Movie. Blazing Saddles was awarded the #6 slot on the American Film Institute's list of Top 100 comedy films of all time. Hertzberg started working as an assistant director in commercials, television and feature films. He was the first assistant director to Frank Perry on the hit cult film, The Swimmer, starring Burt Lancaster.

Hertzberg also wrote the story (with Ronald Bass) and produced Entrapment starring Sean Connery and Catherine Zeta-Jones. He produced Johnny Dangerously starring Michael Keaton and directed by Amy Heckerling (director of Fast Times at Ridgemont High.

On March 27, 1984, he had signed a deal with 20th Century-Fox for a two-year agreement that would cover all directing and producing activities.

Hertzberg has also been interviewed for several behind-the-scenes documentaries including Back in the Saddle (featured on the 2003 DVD release of Blazing Saddles), The Making of The Producers (featured on the MGM Special Edition DVD release of The Producers and The Story of the Swimmer (featured on the 2014 Grindhouse Releasing/Box Office Spectaculars Blu-ray/DVD restoration).

== Filmography ==
- Requiem for a Heavyweight (1962) (assistant director)
- All the Way Home (1963) (assistant director)
- The World of Henry Orient (1964) (assistant director)
- The Producers (1967) (assistant director)
- The Swimmer (1968) (first assistant director)
- Jenny (1970) (assistant director)
- The Twelve Chairs (1970) (producer)
- Summer Wishes, Winter Dreams (1973) (first assistant director)
- Blazing Saddles (1974) (producer)
- Silent Movie (1976) (producer)
- Johnny Dangerously (1984) (producer)
- Out on a Limb (1992) (producer)
- Entrapment (1999) (producer)
- Back in the Saddle (2001) (as himself) (documentary)
- The Making of The Producers (2002) (as himself) (documentary)
- The Story of the Swimmer (2014) (as himself) (documentary)
