= Tung Shin Academy of Nursing =

Private college in Malaysia

Coordinates: 3.145799°N 101.704259°E

- Akademi Kejururawatan Tung Shin (Malay) 同善护士学院 (Chinese)
- Type: Private
- Established: 1992
- Affiliations: Tung Shin Hospital
- Chairman: Mdm. Caroline Tan
- Location: Pudu, Kuala Lumpur, Malaysia
- Website: www.tungshin.com.my/about-us/academy-of-nursing/

Chinese name
- Simplified Chinese: 同善护士学院
- Traditional Chinese: 同善護士學院
Transcriptions
Standard Mandarin
- Hanyu Pinyin: Tóngshàn Hùshì Xuéyuàn

Tung Shin Academy of Nursing (TSAN) is a non-profit, private nursing college located in Pudu, Kuala Lumpur, Malaysia, affiliated to Tung Shin Hospital. Tung Shin Academy of Nursing was started in 1992. To date, more than 350 Assistant Nurses qualified from this academy are serving in various hospitals throughout Malaysia and Singapore.

Tung Shin Academy of Nursing is accredited and recognized by Nursing Board, Ministry of Health Malaysia.

== Programmes ==
Location of Tung Shin Academy of Nursing

In 1992, the academy began a two-year Certificate in Nursing Course, and three years full time Diploma in Nursing in 2012.
