= Swing Vote (1999 film) =

1999 film by David Anspaugh

- UK VHS cover art
- Genre: Drama
- Written by: Ronald Bass; Jane Rusconi
- Directed by: David Anspaugh
- Starring: Andy Garcia
- Music by: Harry Gregson-Williams
- Country of origin: United States
- Original language: English

Production
- Executive producers: Jerry Bruckheimer; Robert N. Fried
- Producers: Richard Brams; Jonathan Littman; Chad Oman
- Cinematography: Johnny E. Jensen
- Editor: Christopher Cibelli
- Running time: 90 minutes
- Production companies: Jerry Bruckheimer Films; Columbia TriStar Television

Original release
- Network: ABC
- Release: April 19, 1999

Swing Vote is a 1999 American drama television film directed by David Anspaugh, written by Ronald Bass and Jane Rusconi, and starring Andy Garcia. It features an alternative reality in which the Supreme Court of the United States has overturned the Roe v. Wade decision and the State of Alabama has subsequently charged a woman with first degree murder for having an abortion. The film was produced by Jerry Bruckheimer Films and Columbia TriStar Television and premiered on ABC on April 19, 1999.

== Story ==
In an alternative reality, the Supreme Court has voted to overturn Roe v Wade. Virginia Mape has been charged and convicted of first degree murder by the state of Alabama for procuring an abortion after that ruling, and her conviction has been appealed directly to the Supreme Court.

Joseph Kirkland, a corporate lawyer with no judicial experience, has recently been appointed to the Supreme Court and moved to Washington D.C. with his wife, anti-abortion activist Linda Kirland, and their daughter Jenny. With no time to settle in, Joseph meets his only clerk, Calley McFearson, before engaging in the court's first extraordinary session, hearing arguments on the appeal. In his first conference, Joseph unexpectedly finds himself catapulted into the hot seat. The Chief Justice explains that when he obtained the necessary votes to overturn Roe v Wade, his majority couldn't agree on the penalties for abortion and so left the rulemaking up to the states, which has led to what some consider to be a bad law from Alabama. Assuming he still has a majority, the Chief is shocked to find his numbers dwindling as Clore Cawley, Sara Brandwynne, Henry Banks and Will Dunn all vote to reverse the conviction. With only Daniel Morrisey, Benjamin Ripley and Eli MacCorckle voting to convict, Joseph is left as the swing vote, but refuses to confirm how he is leaning.

Over the next two nights Joseph begins his soul-searching. He allows Calley to convince him to attend a rally led by Virginia Mapes, seeing her in person and coming to the conclusion that she is a test case; the perfect candidate who could have had an abortion elsewhere, is well-educated and articulate, and has been hand-picked to challenge the law. As he meets with Arthur Jacklyn, a prominent anti-abortion activist who has been jailed previously, the Chief works on swaying the votes of the other justices; he brings Clore Cawley on side by promising to write an opinion attacking the Alabama law and forcing them to revoke it, and convinces Sara Brandwynne that if she joins his opinion he can cut the hardline Benjamin Ripley loose and let her draft a section on lenient sentencing.

At home, meanwhile, things get heated. Linda receives a call from Marley Terrell, Jenny's birth mother, who says she is coming to see them, something Joseph is extremely opposed to. In the end the couple reveal to Jenny that she is adopted, and Marley's visit is actually an opportunity for her to plead with Joseph not to allow abortion to become legal again as it would mean children like Jenny would be destroyed in the womb rather than put up for adoption.

Visiting retired and ailing Justice Harlan Greene, who he has replaced, Joseph asks for his help in ironing out the thoughts he has been working with and getting him to the necessary number of votes to command a majority. Harlan's response is simply: "you get me to four votes. I'll get you to five." Later, Daniel Morrissey visits Justice Greene and is convinced to swing his vote to Joseph. The Chief, made aware of Joseph's thinking by Eli MacCorckle, tries to convince him not to go for five votes.

After a climatic argument with Will Dunn, who cannot bring himself to join the majority Joseph is cobbling together, the court reconvenes to pass its judgement. In a surprise to the court, the judgement is delivered by Joseph himself. He announces that abortion will once again be legal at up to 20 weeks, after which the court imposes a coherent package of stringent conditions to limit, but not outlaw, the procedure. Joseph goes one step further and places adoption on the agenda, pointing out that the country is going through a massive adoption crisis and that neither pro-choice nor anti-abortion candidates seem to be "pro-child" in that regard. He confirms the majority opinion of himself, Will Dunn, Sara Brandwynne, Hank Banks and Daniel Morrissey. The court is further shocked when, throwing all precedent out of the window, Justices Eli MacCorckle and Clore Cawley switch their votes after the judgement is announced, giving Joseph a majority of 7.

The film closes as Benjamin Ripley, one of two dissenting voices, begins delivering his oral dissent.

== Cast ==
- Andy García as Joseph Michael Kirkland
- Harry Belafonte as Justice Will Dunn
- Robert Prosky as Chief Justice of the United States “Bobby”
- Ray Walston as Justice Clore Cawley
- James Whitmore as Justice Daniel Morrissey
- Kate Nelligan as Justice Sara Marie Brandwynne
- Milo O'Shea as retired Justice Harlan Greene
- Albert Hall as Justice Hank Banks
- Bob Balaban as Justice Eli MacCorckle
- John Aylward as Justice Benjamin "Rip" Ripley
- LisaGay Hamilton as Virginia Mapes
- Margaret Colin as Linda Kirkland
- Hallie Eisenberg as Jenny Kirkland
- Michael O'Keefe as Arthur Jacklyn
- Tracey Ellis as Marley Terrell
- Hedy Burress as Calley McFearson

== Production ==
Filming took place in Los Angeles.

== Critical reception ==
Swing Vote received mixed reviews, with critics praising the cast but criticizing the script as lacking credible dialogue and featuring overly convenient plot points. Ray Richmond of Variety said the teleplay by Ron Bass and Jane Rusconi "is literate, sensitively wrought and painstakingly balanced; the problem is that practically everything that exits someone's lips sounds like a speech". He noted "both sides of the abortion mess are likely to be unsatisfied by 'Swing Vote,' but possibly this displeasure actually speaks to the film's profound lack of bias".

Alan Pergament of The Buffalo News wrote: "The Supreme Court conferences are filled with political games, smart humor and some surprising personal revelations that brand this talkative movie as serious-minded and make it interesting. But the movie breaks down when Kirkland visits a variety of places -- from his home and the defendant's home to a pro-choice rally (in a Yankees cap yet) to a hospital -- to sort out his feelings about abortion, adoption and what freedom means."

Scott D. Pierce of the Deseret News praised the film for offering intelligent arguments on both sides of the abortion debate, adding "and...while there are obviously disagreements, no one is mocked or belittled for their beliefs -- from the most liberal to the most conservative characters. That, in and of itself, is nothing short of remarkable."
