= Albukhary Mosque =

Mosque in Alor Setar, Kedah, Malaysia

- Masjid Albukhary
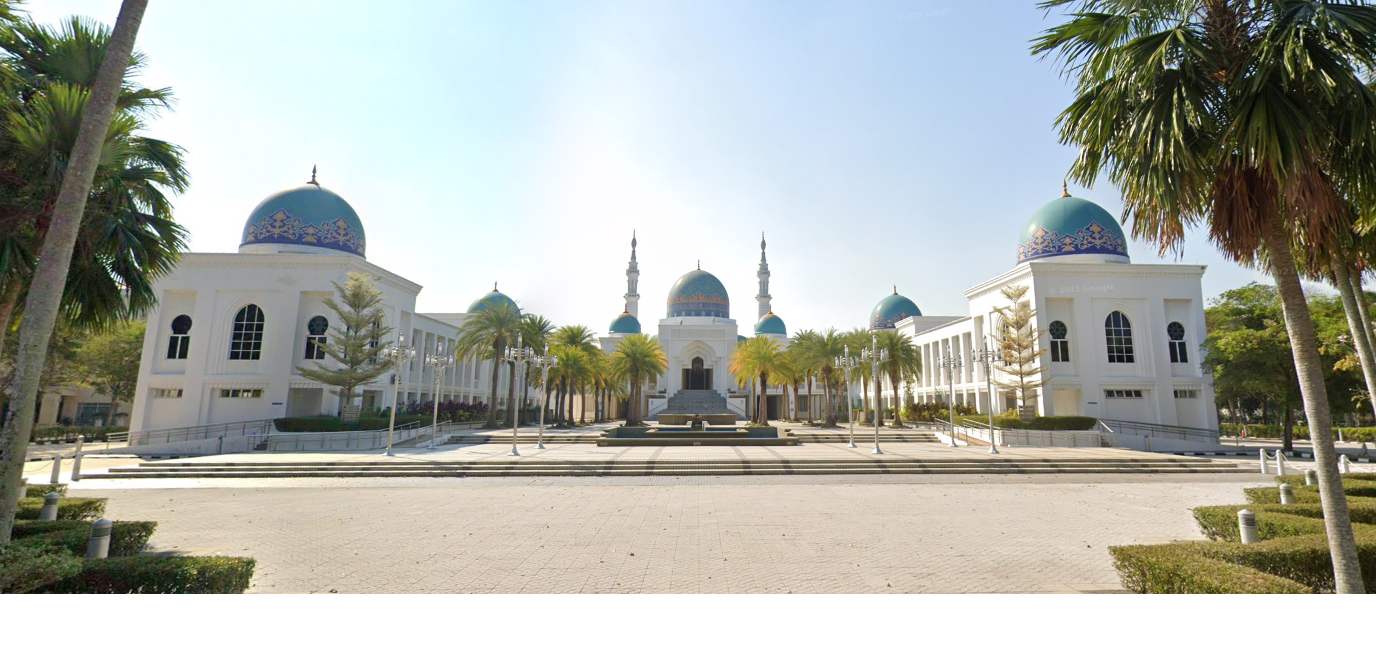

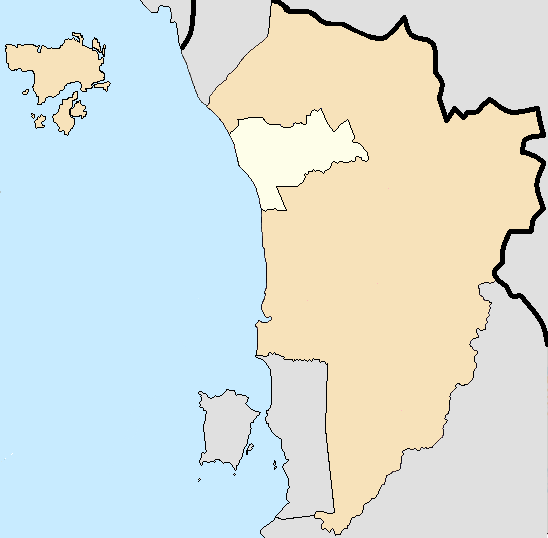
- Location within Alor Setar

Religion
- Affiliation: Sunni Islam
- Ecclesiastical or organisational status: Active

Location
- Location: Jalan Langgar, 05460 Alor Setar, Kedah Darul Aman.
- State: Kedah
- Country: Malaysia
- Coordinates: 6.1464°N 100.3892°E

Architecture
- Architect: Abdul Harris Othman (RDA Harris Design Group)
- Type: Mosque
- Founder: Tan Sri Syed Mokhtar Albukhary
- Funded by: Albukhary Foundation
- Groundbreaking: 1999
- Completed: 2001

Specifications
- Capacity: 15,000 (complex); 3,000 (main hall)
- Dome: 7
- Minaret: 1
- Minaret height: 47.92 m (157.2 ft)

Website
- www.masjidalbukhary.com.my

The Albukhary Mosque (Malay: Masjid Albukhary) is a mosque located in Alor Setar, Kedah, Malaysia. It serves as the spiritual centerpiece of the Albukhary Complex, which also houses the Albukhary International University and a medical center.

The mosque was commissioned by the Albukhary Foundation, a charity organization established by the Malaysian philanthropist Tan Sri Syed Mokhtar Albukhary. It shares its name with the Masjid Albukhary KL, a sister mosque in the capital city which was built by the same foundation five years later.

== History ==
The groundbreaking ceremony for the mosque was held on 15 January 1999, officiated by the then Prime Minister of Malaysia, Mahathir Mohamad. Construction commenced in March 2000.

The mosque was fully completed in 2001. It was officially inaugurated on 22 November 2001 (coinciding with 6 Ramadan 1422H) by the Sultan of Kedah, Sultan Abdul Halim Mu'adzam Shah.

In December 2020, the mosque opened the Albukhary Mosque Gallery, the first of its kind in Kedah, to showcase the history and architectural evolution of the site.

== Architecture ==
The mosque was designed by architect Abdul Harris Othman of RDA Harris Design Group. It features an eclectic architectural style that blends elements from the Islamic world, specifically drawing inspiration from Turkey, Iran, Egypt, and Morocco. The design was intended to showcase the diversity of Islamic heritage.

=== Domes and Minarets ===
The exterior is dominated by seven blue domes, which symbolize the seven continents where the message of Islam has spread. The main dome features intricate carvings of the 99 Names of Allah on its interior.

The design of the main dome is heavily influenced by the Shah Mosque (Imam Mosque) in Isfahan, Iran. The mosque features twin minarets that stand 47.92 m (157.2 ft) tall, designed in the Mamluk style with influences from Al-Masjid an-Nabawi in Medina.

=== Interior and Courtyard ===
The mosque's entrance features a courtyard (sahn) with geometric water features and reflective pools. This layout mimics the architecture of the Mausoleum of Imam al-Bukhari in Samarkand, Uzbekistan.

The main prayer hall can accommodate approximately 3,000 worshippers, while the entire mosque complex, including the courtyard and surrounding areas, can hold up to 15,000 people during peak congregations such as Eid prayers.

== Albukhary Complex ==
The mosque is part of the Sharifah Rokiah Centre of Excellence (named after the founder's mother). This integrated hub includes:

- Albukhary International University: A non-profit private university located within the same grounds.
- Souq Albukhary: A commercial market designed with architecture inspired by the Citadel of Bukhara.
- Medical Facilities: A dialysis center (Pusat Hemodialisis) and clinics for the underprivileged.
- Orphanage: The complex includes an orphanage and an old folks' home managed by the foundation.

== See also ==
- Masjid Albukhary (Kuala Lumpur) – The sister mosque in Kuala Lumpur.
- Islam in Malaysia
- List of mosques in Malaysia
