= Pudu, Kuala Lumpur =

District in Kuala Lumpur, Malaysia

Coordinates: 3.140°N 101.708°E

Pudu
- Town
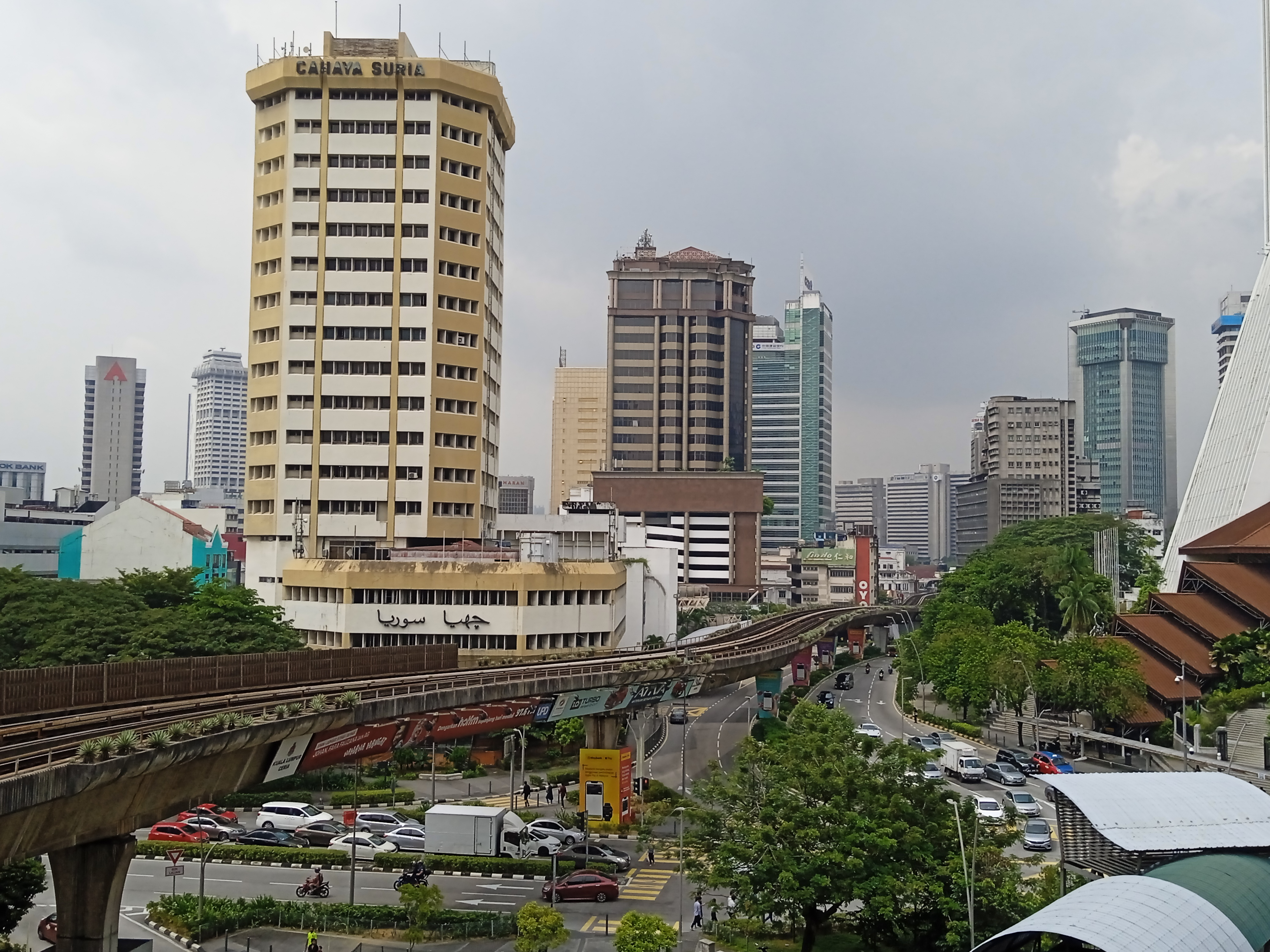
- Interactive map of Pudu
- Country: Malaysia
- State: Federal Territory of Kuala Lumpur
- Constituency: Bukit Bintang

Government
  - Local Authority: Dewan Bandaraya Kuala Lumpur
  - Mayor: Kamarulzaman Mat Salleh
- Time zone: UTC+8 (MST)
- Postcode: 55200
- Dialling code: +603

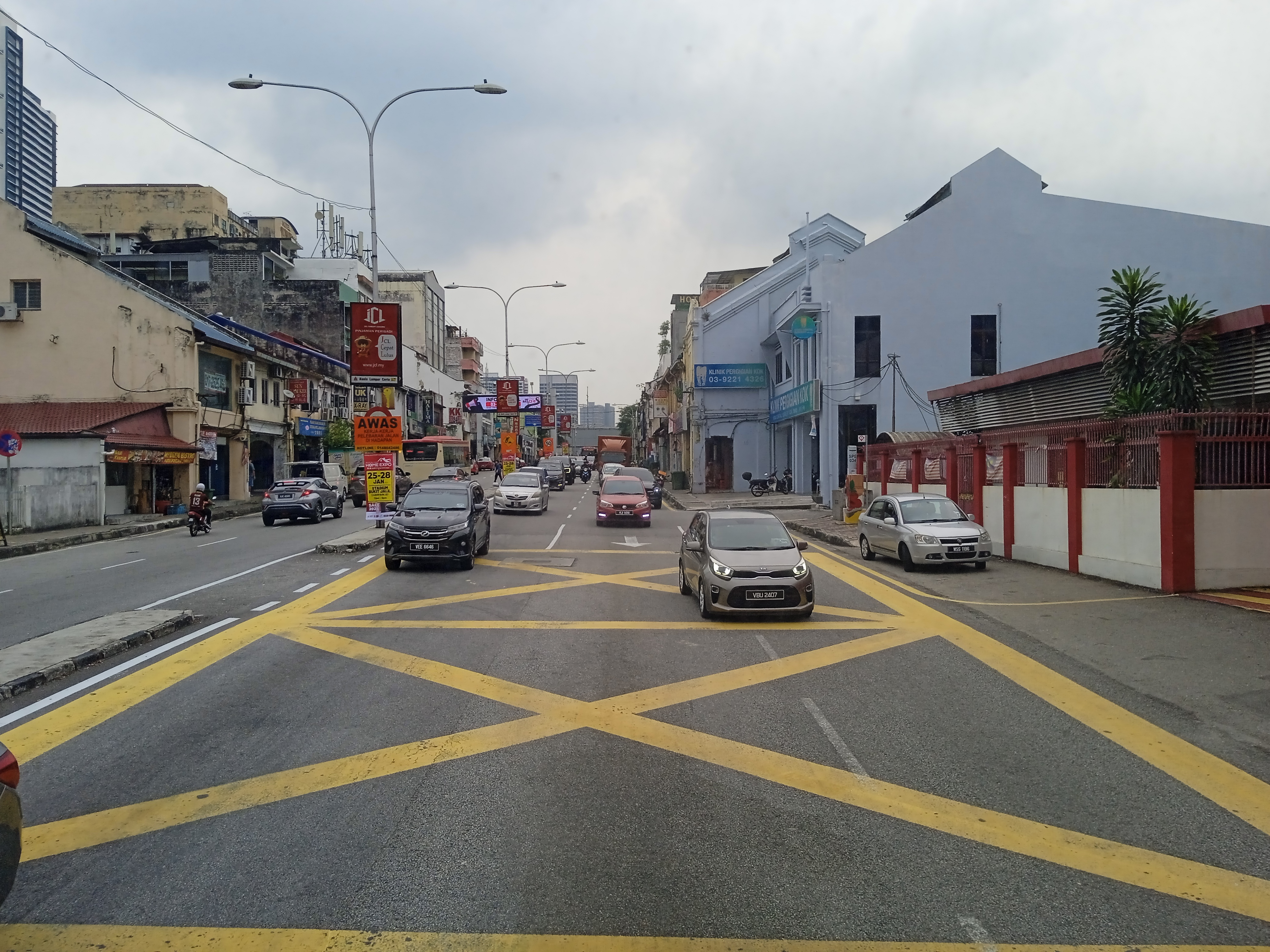
Jalan Pudu, main street in Pudu

Pudu is a ward of Kuala Lumpur located along the Federal Route 1 Pudu Road (Malay: Jalan Pudu). It houses Pudu Sentral (Kuala Lumpur's oldest bus station) and formerly Pudu Prison. Pudu Market (Malay: Pasar Besar Pudu) is one of the largest wet markets in Kuala Lumpur. Adjacent to it is Jalan Pasar (Pasar Road) where there are shops selling electronics components and devices.

During colonial rule, Pudu was known as Pudoh.

Pudu is sandwiched between Bukit Bintang, Maluri and Cheras.

The Bukit Bintang City Centre development is located at the border of Pudu and Bukit Bintang right beside the Hang Tuah LRT and monorail station.

The Ampang Line and Sri Petaling Line Pudu LRT station's sign was used in the movie Entrapment, although it was the Bukit Jalil LRT station that was used as the filming location.

== Transportation ==
- Pudu LRT station

== Education ==
- Tung Shin Academy Of Nursing

== Politics ==
Pudu is mostly located in the Bukit Bintang parliamentary constituency, though a part spills over into Cheras constituency,
