= Al-Bukhari Foundation Mosque =

Mosque in Kuala Lumpur, Malaysia

Albukhary Mosque KL
- Masjid Albukhary
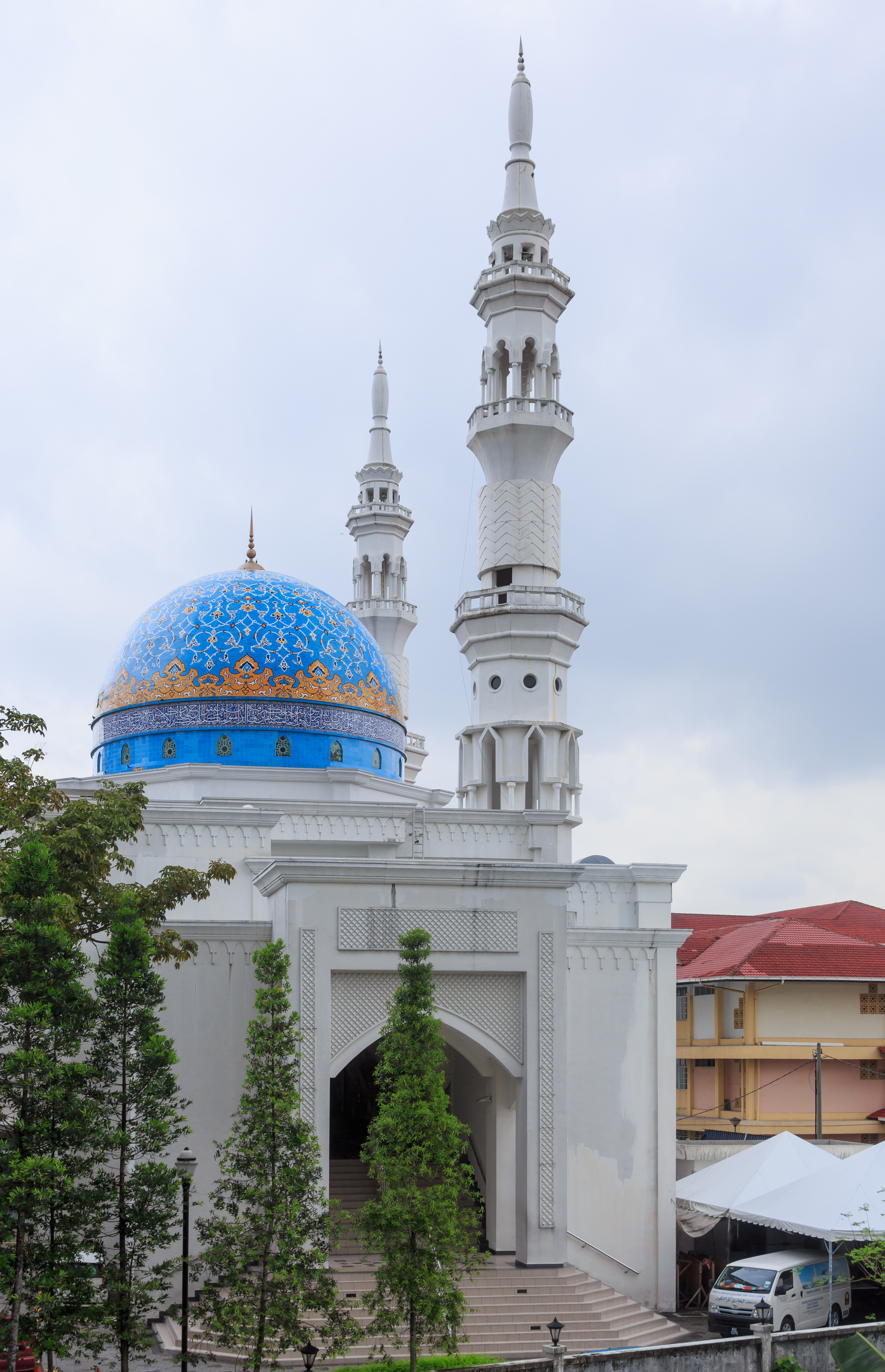
- Main Facade of the Mosque

- Location in Kuala Lumpur

Religion
- Affiliation: Sunni Islam
- Ecclesiastical or organizational status: Active

Location
- Location: 1, Jalan Hang Tuah, 50200 Kuala Lumpur
- Country: Malaysia
- Interactive map of Albukhary Mosque KL
- Territory: Federal Territory of Kuala Lumpur
- Coordinates: 3°08′23.0″N 101°42′17.3″E

Architecture
- Type: Mosque
- Funded by: Albukhary Foundation
- Groundbreaking: September 2004
- Completed: September 2006
- Construction cost: RM12 million

Specifications
- Capacity: 1,600–3,000
- Dome: 1
- Minaret: 2

Website
- masjidalbukharykl.com

The Masjid Albukhary KL is a mosque located in Kuala Lumpur, Malaysia. It is situated on Jalan Hang Tuah, adjacent to the Victoria Institution and opposite the Hang Tuah station.

It shares its name with the Masjid Albukhary, the headquarters mosque of the foundation located in Alor Setar, Kedah. Both mosques are owned and managed by the Albukhary Foundation.

== History ==
The mosque was constructed to replace the 147-year-old Surau Babul Jannah, which was located on the same site but had become dilapidated. The site was originally gazette by the British government as an Islamic cemetery in 1922.

The proposal to build a new mosque was initiated in 2001 by the Mosque Project Committee with approval from the Mufti of the Federal Territory. Construction began in September 2004 and was fully completed in September 2006 at a cost of RM12 million, funded entirely by the Albukhary Foundation led by Tan Sri Syed Mokhtar Albukhary.

The mosque was officially handed over to the Federal Territory Islamic Religious Department (JAWI) on 25 May 2007. The inaugural Friday prayer was led by the Yemeni scholar Habib Umar bin Hafiz.

== Architecture and features ==
The mosque covers an area of 2,700 m^{2} (29,000 sq ft). It features a blend of classical Islamic architectural styles:

- Dome: The main prayer hall is topped by a single blue "onion-shaped" dome, adorned with intricate geometric patterns inspired by the Shah Mosque in Isfahan, Iran (sometimes cited as Uzbekistan style). The exterior of the dome uses glass ceramics imported from Italy.
- Minarets: The mosque has two tall minarets, the design of which was inspired by the Al-Masjid an-Nabawi (Prophet's Mosque) in Medina.

The mosque has a capacity of approximately 1,600 to 3,000 worshippers across its two prayer halls. Facilities within the complex include a community hall, classrooms, an orphanage, an old folks' home, and a mortuary for funeral management.

== See also ==
- Masjid Albukhary – The sister mosque in Alor Setar.
- Islam in Malaysia
- List of mosques in Malaysia
