= Hang Tuah station =

Integrated LRT and monorail station in Kuala Lumpur, Malaysia

AG9 SP9 MR4 BBCC – Hang Tuah
- Exterior of the Hang Tuah station

General information
- Other names: Malay: هڠ تواه (Jawi); Chinese: 汉都亚; Tamil: ஆங் துவா
- Location: Bukit Bintang City Centre, Jalan Hang Tuah, Pudu; 55200 Kuala Lumpur; Malaysia
- Coordinates: 3°8′24″N 101°42′21″E
- System: Rapid KL
- Owner: Prasarana Malaysia
- Operator: Rapid Rail
- Lines: 3 Ampang Line; 4 Sri Petaling Line; 8 KL Monorail
- Platforms: 2 side platforms (LRT); 2 side platforms (Monorail)
- Tracks: 4

Construction
- Structure type: AG9 SP9 Subsurface; MR4 Elevated
- Platform levels: 4
- Parking: Not available

Other information
- Station code: AG9 SP9 MR4

History
- Opened: 16 December 1996; 29 years ago (LRT); 31 August 2003; 23 years ago (Monorail)

Services
Preceding station		Following station
Plaza Rakyat towards Sentul Timur	Ampang Line	Pudu towards Ampang
Plaza Rakyat towards Sentul Timur	Sri Petaling Line	Pudu towards Putra Heights
Maharajalela towards Kuala Lumpur Sentral	KL Monorail	Imbi towards Titiwangsa
Location

Hang Tuah station, also known as BBCC–Hang Tuah station due to the new transit hub, is an interchange station in the Pudu district of Kuala Lumpur, Malaysia, served by the Ampang and Sri Petaling Lines and the KL Monorail. Seamless physical and fare integration was achieved on 1 March 2012 when the "paid-up" or restricted areas of both the LRT and monorail stations, which previously operated as two separate stations, were linked up, allowing passengers to transfer without needing to buy new tickets for the first time since the monorail became operational in 2003.

Located right beside the Bukit Bintang City Centre (BBCC), the station is in the vicinity of the Methodist Boys' School of Kuala Lumpur, Victoria Institution, Bukit Aman (Kuala Lumpur Contingent Police Headquarters) and Stadium Negara.

== History ==
=== LRT Ampang and Sri Petaling Lines ===
The light rapid transit (LRT) station was formed in 1996 with the completion of the Hang Tuah LRT station along a reused stretch of a long abandoned railway line, used by STAR LRT (now Ampang and Sri Petaling Lines) trains. The station was one of the first 13 STAR LRT rapid transit stations to open in the city, part of Phase 1 of the opening of the STAR LRT system (then known as "System I"). (Note: System I referred to the rapid transit concession operated by STAR, while System II referred to the rapid transit operated by PUTRA which is now the LRT Kelana Jaya Line.) This phase consisted of the rapid transit line from Ampang to Sultan Ismail. Phase 2 of the line was completed in 1998 with the opening of the Chan Sow Lin-Sri Petaling and Sultan Ismail-Sentul Timur routes. (The route towards Sri Petaling has since been extended to Putra Heights.

The surface level station consists of two sheltered subsurface platforms connected to a sheltered ticketing concourse above on the ground level, linked via staircases, escalators and lifts, and exiting to Jalan Hang Tuah. The station layout is similar to that of Jalan Ipoh and Sri Rampai stations on the MRT Putrajaya Line and LRT Kelana Jaya Line respectively.

=== KL Monorail ===
The area saw the addition of the Hang Tuah Monorail station, a separate station that provides access to Kuala Lumpur Monorail (KL Monorail) services, with the opening of the line on 31 August 2003. The station, like virtually all other KL Monorail stations, is elevated and built over Jalan Hang Tuah, but was not initially directly integrated to the nearby existing LRT station until 2012. The station had two exits that lead to either side Jalan Hang Tuah, and is adjacent to and located northeast from the LRT station. The station was previously only accessible via stairways and escalators. The station's length is also longer in comparison to other KL Monorail stations.

The Hang Tuah monorail station is one of four Kuala Lumpur Monorail stations that serve the Kuala Lumpur Golden Triangle locality, the other three being the Raja Chulan, the Bukit Bintang and the Imbi. The station is also one of two KL Monorail stations that are designated as an interchange with the Ampang Line and Sri Petaling Line, the other being Titiwangsa.

=== Integrated Hang Tuah Station ===
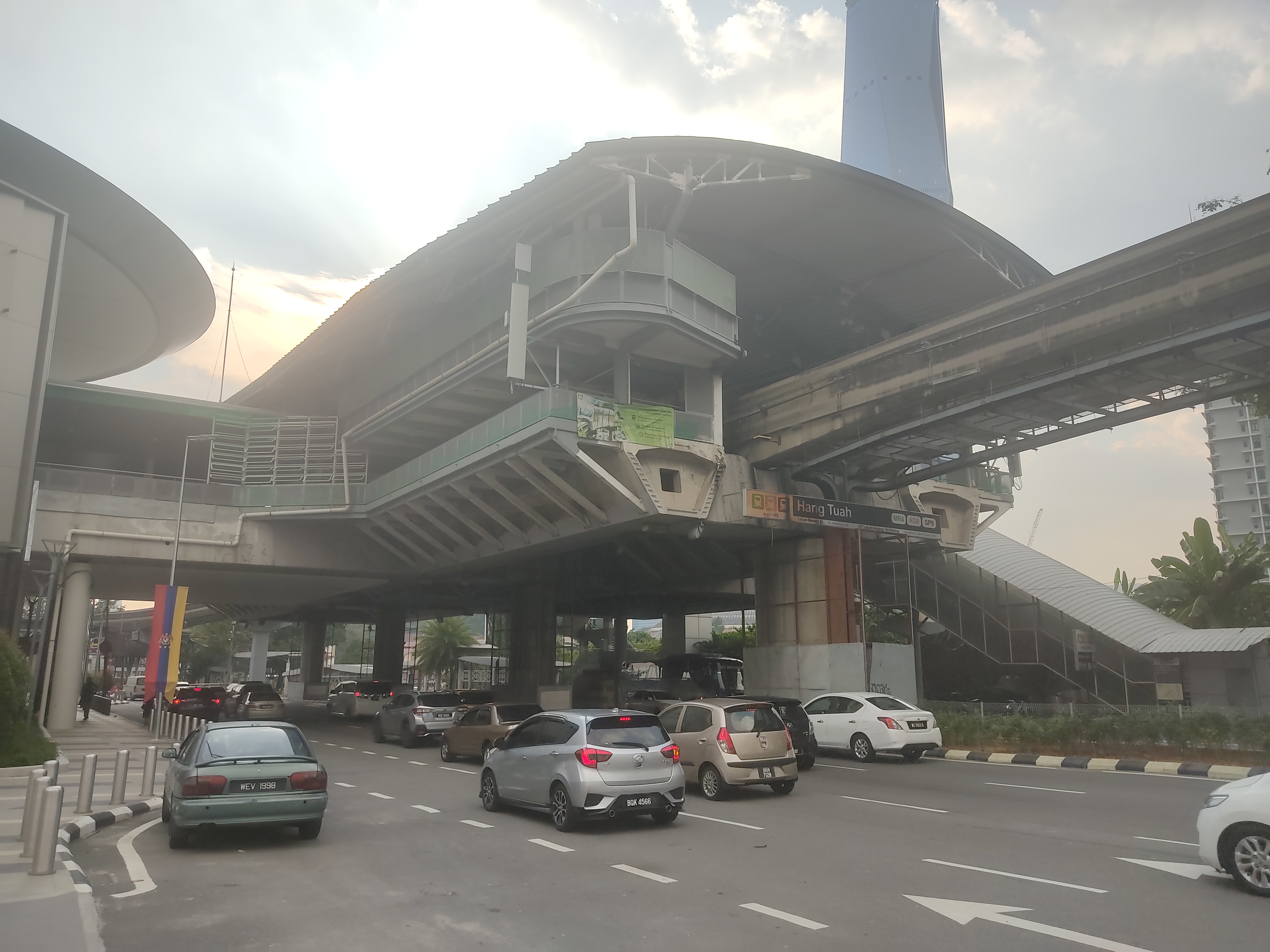
Hang Tuah station with Merdeka 118 seen in the background

The proximity of the monorail station with the LRT station meant both stations are designated in official transit maps as interchange stations between the three lines, and is subsequently used heavily primarily to reach Bukit Bintang and the surrounding areas via the Monorail line from the LRT lines. Since 2013, the two stations have been physically linked so it is no longer required to exit one station or to use the public sidewalk outside the station to reach the other station or to change lines.

== Around the station ==
- Mitsui Shopping Park LaLaport Bukit Bintang City Centre
- Bukit Bintang City Centre (BBCC)
- Victoria Institution
- Al-Bukhari Foundation Mosque
- Merdeka 118 precinct
- Merdeka 118
- 118 Mall
- Kenanga Wholesale City
