= Smile Foundation of Bali =

Balinese non-profit organization

The Smile Foundation of Bali
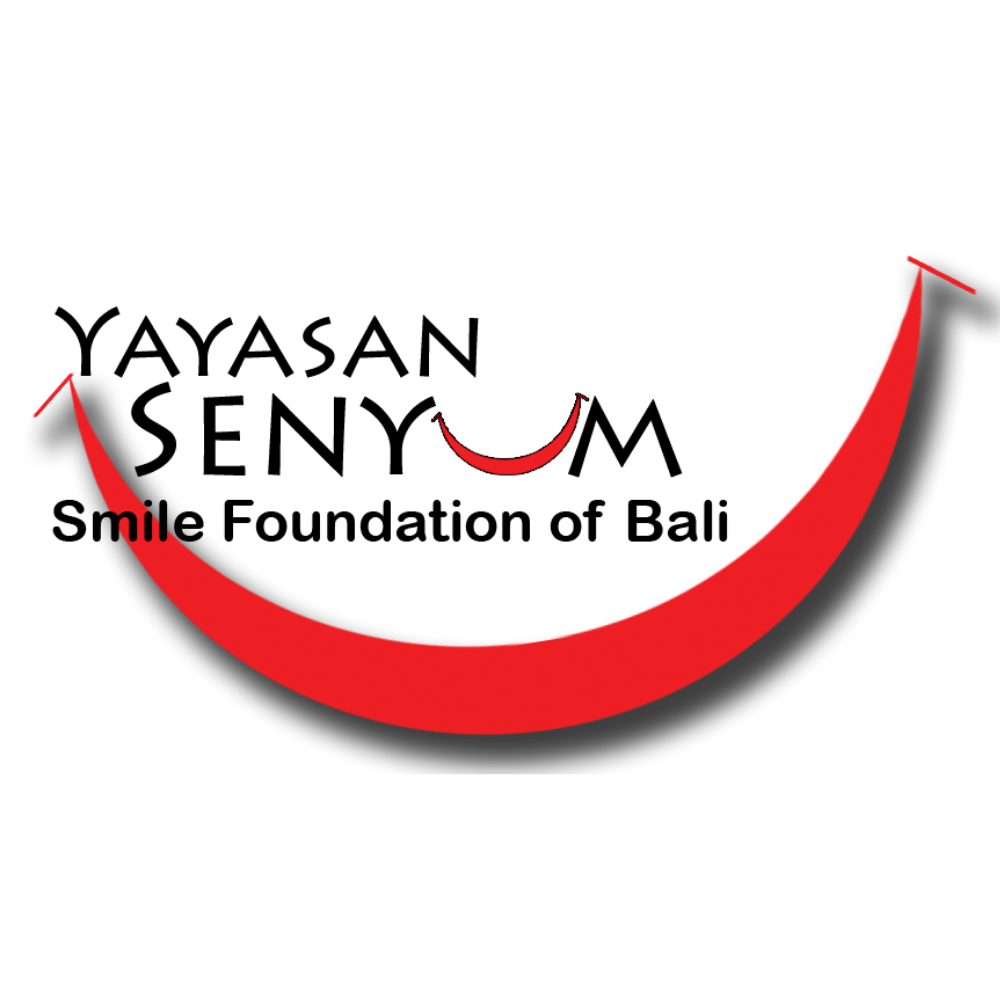
- Founded: 2005
- Founder: Mary Northmore-Aziz
- Type: Humanitarian Foundation
- Location: Bali, Indonesia
- Region served: Bali, Lombok, and Eastern Indonesia
- Key people: Mary Northmore-Aziz, Profesor David John David AC,dr. Anak Agung Gde Ngurah Asmarajaya, Sp.B, Sp.BP-RE(K)
- Website: SenyumBali.org

The Smile Foundation of Bali (Yayasan Senyum) is a non-profit organisation based in Bali, Indonesia, that helps people with craniofacial disabilities obtain comprehensive health care. Senyum means smile in Indonesian and yayasan means 'foundation'.

The Smile Foundation facilitates operations for cleft lip and palate and other craniofacial deformities, due to birth defects, accidents, or tumours. The organisation helps underprivileged patients from Bali, Lombok, and remote islands across Eastern Indonesia, raising funds for operations whether in Bali or Adelaide, Australia at the Australian Craniofacial Unit.

== History ==
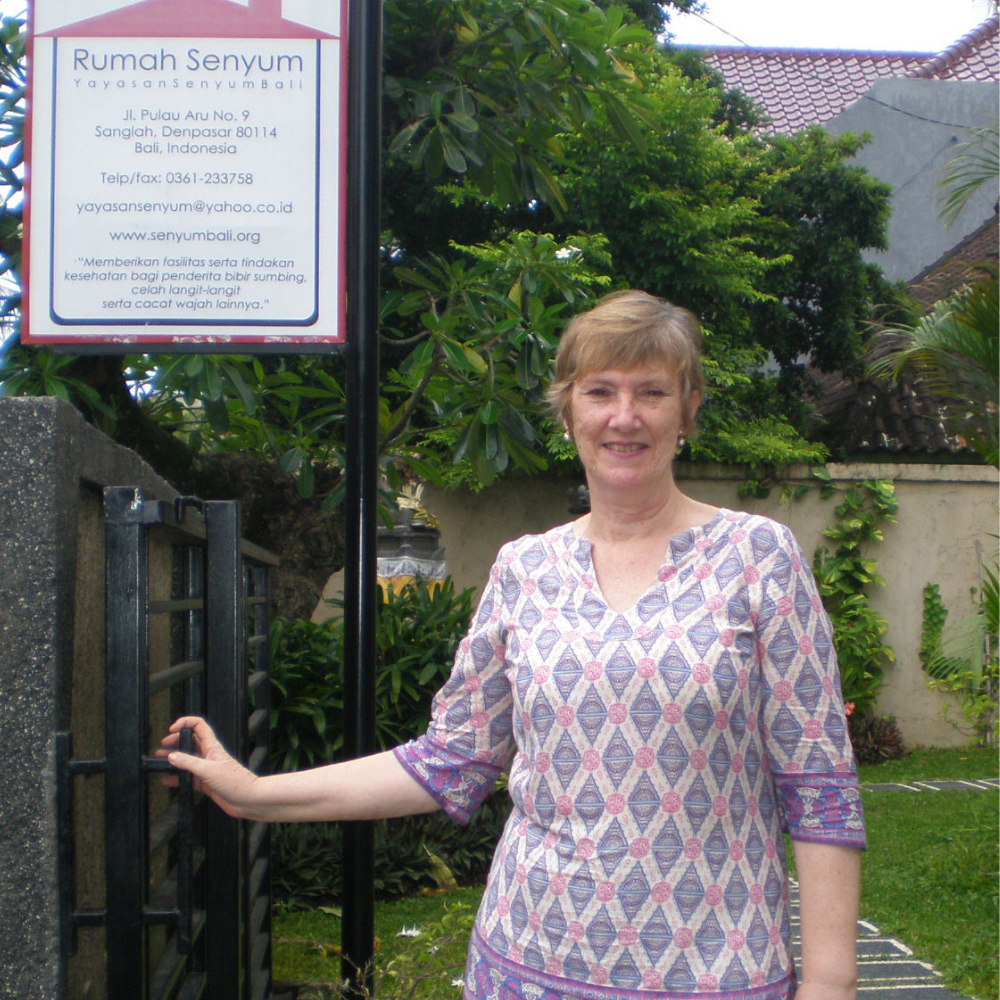
Mary Northmore-Aziz, founder of The Smile Foundation of Bali, who started the initiative in 2005.

The Smile Foundation of Bali was founded in 2005 by Mary Northmore-Aziz at the suggestion of Profesor David John David AC from the Australian Craniofacial Unit, to identify those in need of craniofacial surgery. Profesor David John David AC has continued his association as the chief adviser to the foundation. In December 2006 the foundation opened its first "Smile Shop", which was the pioneer of charity thrift shops in Bali.

After extensive fundraising, the "Smile House" was opened in January 2007 in Denpasar. The Smile House provides accommodation and educational facilities, in particular for those from outlying areas.

== Programs and Medical Partners ==
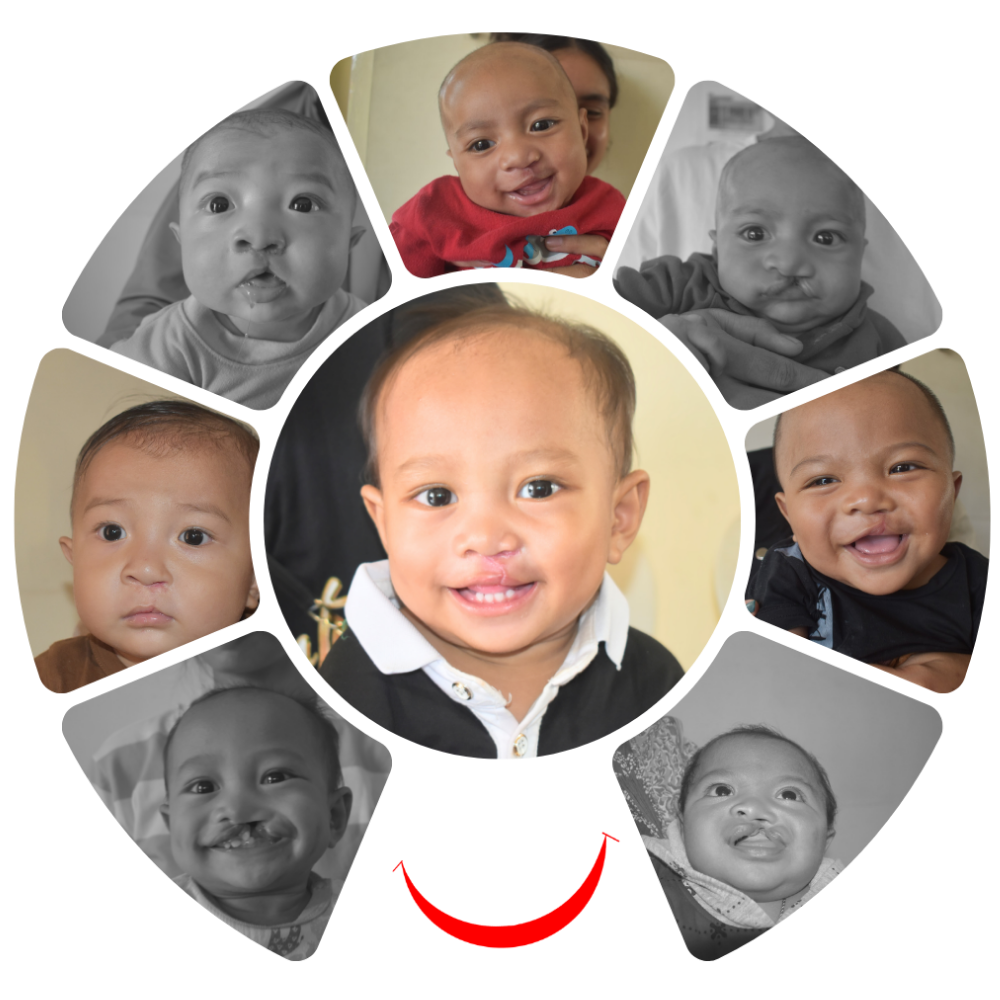
The three core pillars of the foundation: Medical Treatment, Medical Outreach, and Speech Therapy.

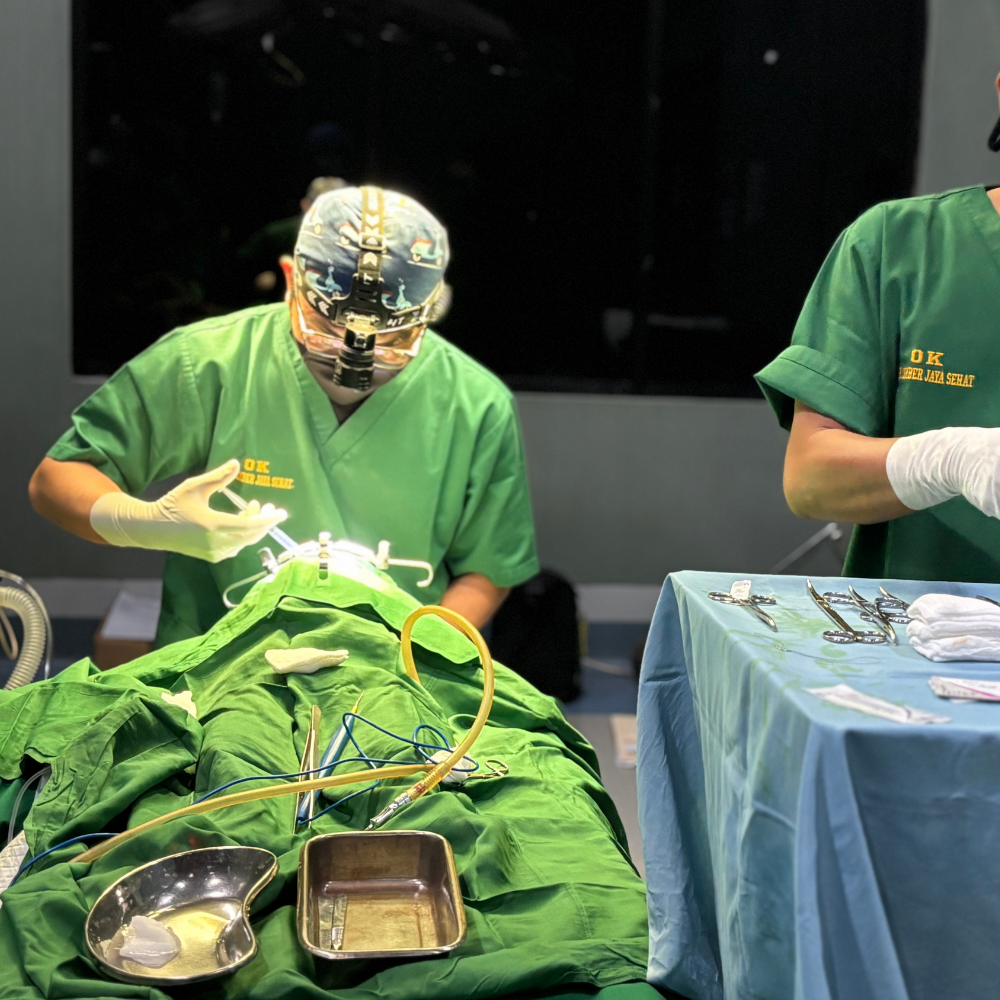
A medical outreach mission in Eastern Indonesia, coordinating free cleft lip surgeries for local communities.

The foundation focuses on three primary pillars of service to deliver holistic care for people suffering from craniofacial disabilities:

- Medical Treatment: A primary focus of the foundation is providing access to free cleft lip and palate surgeries. Each patient receives personalized care from the initial surgery to follow-up appointments, as well as ongoing consultation and therapy.
- Medical Outreach: In collaboration with local hospitals and medical partners, the foundation actively coordinates medical outreach missions to identify and assist patients in remote sites across Eastern Indonesia.
- Speech Therapy: Post-operative care involves dedicated support to ensure full recovery. With the assistance of trained speech therapists, children participate in personalized sessions to help them develop normal speaking patterns and integrate confidently into society.

To deliver these crucial services, the foundation collaborates with an extensive network of healthcare partners across the region. This includes major hospitals like Kasih Ibu Hospital, BROS Hospital, BIMC Hospital, Rumah Sakit Bhayangkara Denpasar, and regional public hospitals such as RSUD Bangli and RSU Negara. Diagnostic and wellness support is also facilitated through trusted partners like Laboratorium Klinik Prodia, Bio Medika, and NgoerahSun Wellness & Aesthetic Center.

This comprehensive care often involves organising visas, passports, and round-trip flights for the patients. For patients being treated in Denpasar, the Smile House provides full logistical support including safe accommodation and daily meals for both the patient and an accompanying family member.

== Funding and operation ==
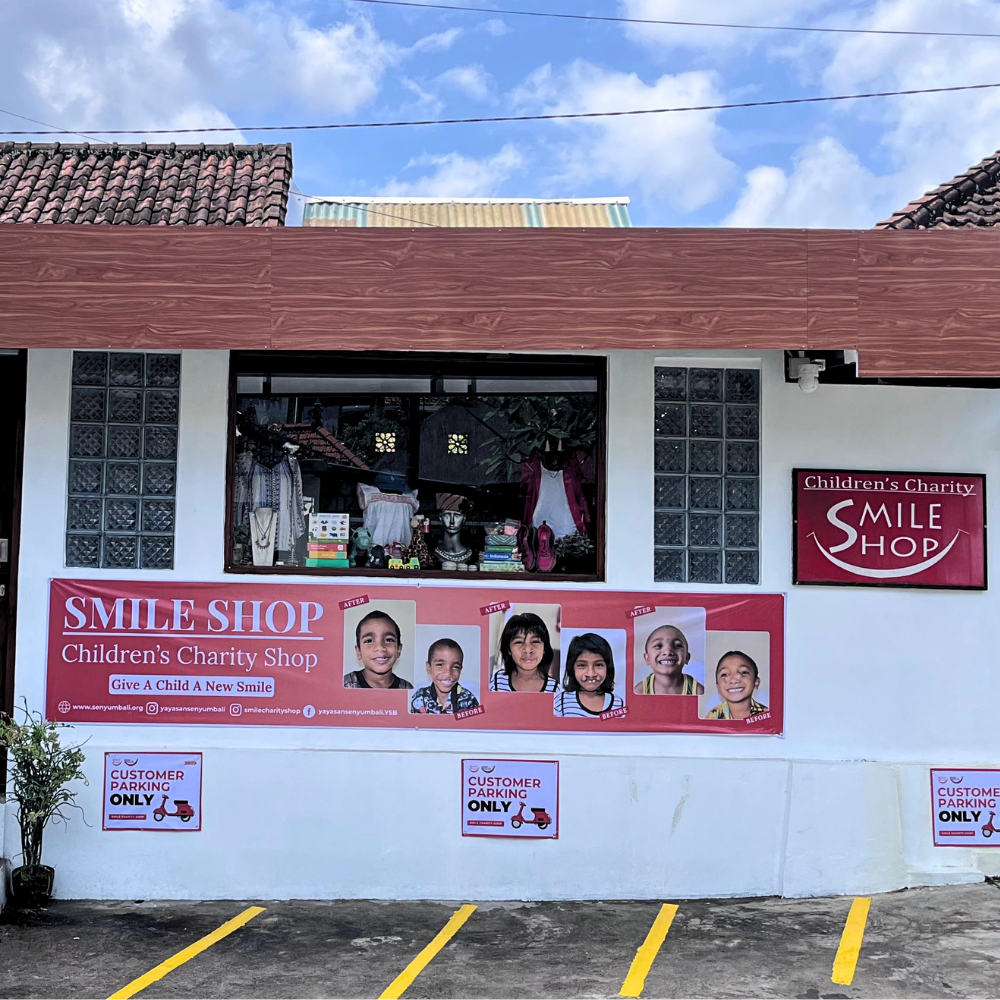
The "Smile Shop" in Ubud, the pioneer of charity thrift shops in Bali.

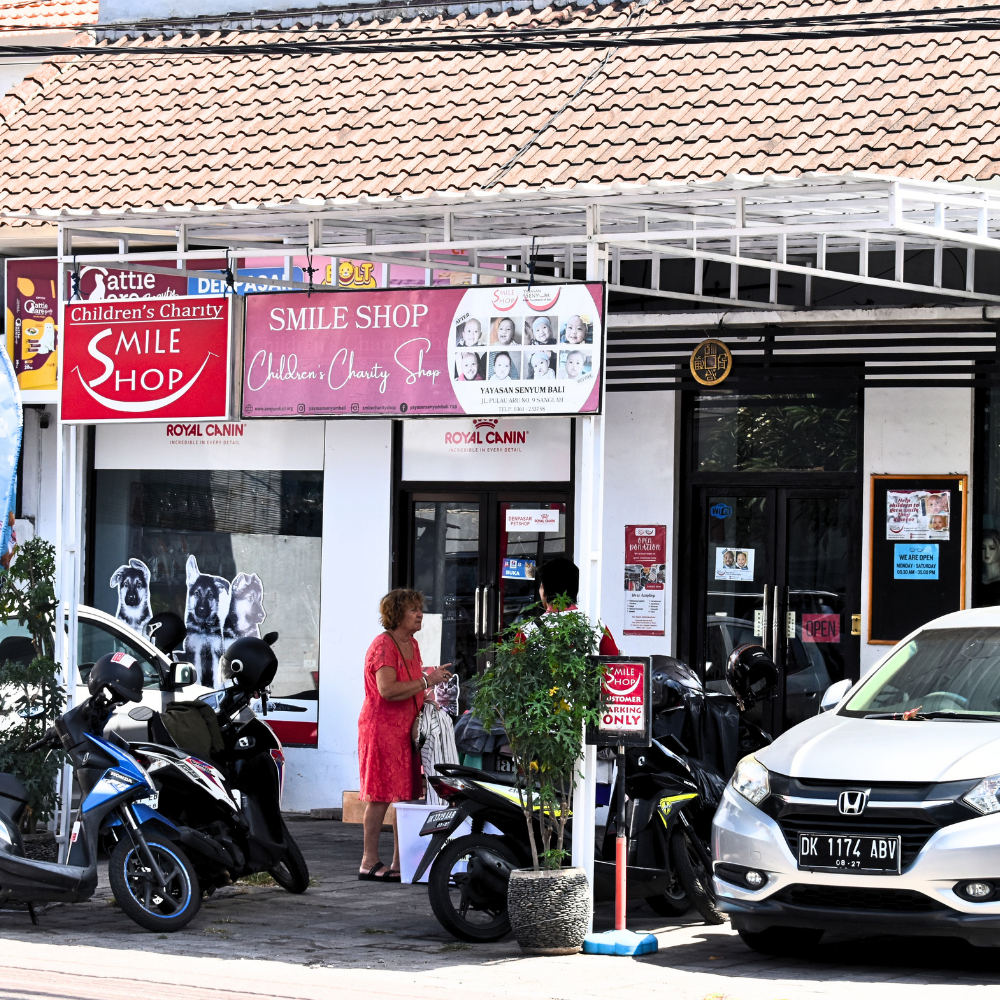
The "Smile Shop" branch located in Sanur, Denpasar.

The foundation sustains its operations through a diverse range of funding streams. Financial and logistical support comes from corporate sponsors, humanitarian organizations, and local contributors.

Furthermore, the foundation receives significant contributions from the local hospitality and tourism sectors. Notable contributors include Australian Aid, Finns Bali, Waterbom Bali, Biku, and renowned accommodations such as InterContinental Bali Resort in Jimbaran, COMO Shambhala Estate, The Haven Bali Seminyak, Sebatu Sanctuary, and Amadea Resort & Villas. Financial transparency is maintained through regular public reporting.

Additional crucial funds are raised through the foundation's charity thrift stores, known as the "Smile Shop", where 100% of the profits go directly to the foundation. Staffed entirely by volunteers, these shops offer a variety of items including pre-loved fashion, toys and plushies, household goods, artworks, paintings, jewelry, and accessories—all donated by expatriates, local businesses, and hotels. The foundation currently operates two branches:

- Smile Shop Ubud: Jl. Raya Nyuh Kuning No.4, Mas, Kecamatan Ubud, Kabupaten Gianyar, Bali 80571
- Smile Shop Sanur: Jl. Danau Buyan No.21, Sanur, Denpasar Selatan, Kota Denpasar, Bali 80227</ref>

== See also ==
- Senang Hati Foundation
