= Entrapment (film) =

1999 film by Jon Amiel

- Theatrical release poster
- Directed by: Jon Amiel
- Screenplay by: Ronald Bass; William Broyles, Jr.
- Story by: Ronald Bass; Michael Hertzberg
- Produced by: Sean Connery; Michael Hertzberg; Rhonda Tollefson
- Starring: Sean Connery; Catherine Zeta-Jones; Will Patton; Maury Chaykin; Ving Rhames
- Cinematography: Phil Méheux
- Edited by: Terry Rawlings
- Music by: Christopher Young
- Production companies: Fox 2000 Pictures; New Regency
- Distributed by: 20th Century Fox
- Release dates: 30 April 1999 (United States); 27 May 1999 (Germany); 2 July 1999 (United Kingdom)
- Running time: 114 minutes
- Countries: United States; United Kingdom; Germany
- Language: English
- Budget: $66 million
- Box office: $212 million

Entrapment is a 1999 heist film directed by Jon Amiel and written by Ronald Bass. It stars Sean Connery and Catherine Zeta-Jones and includes Will Patton, Ving Rhames and Maury Chaykin. The film focuses on the relationship between an investigator and a professional thief as they attempt a heist at the turn of the millennium.

Simon West and Antoine Fuqua were both in talks to direct before Amiel was hired. Principal photography took place from June to October 1998 at locations in Britain and Malaysia. The score was composed by Christopher Young, and British singer Seal performs "Lost My Faith" over the end credits.

Entrapment was released theatrically by 20th Century Fox in the United States on 30 April 1999 and in the United Kingdom on 2 July. It received mixed reviews from critics, and grossed $212 million worldwide on a $66 million production budget.

== Plot ==
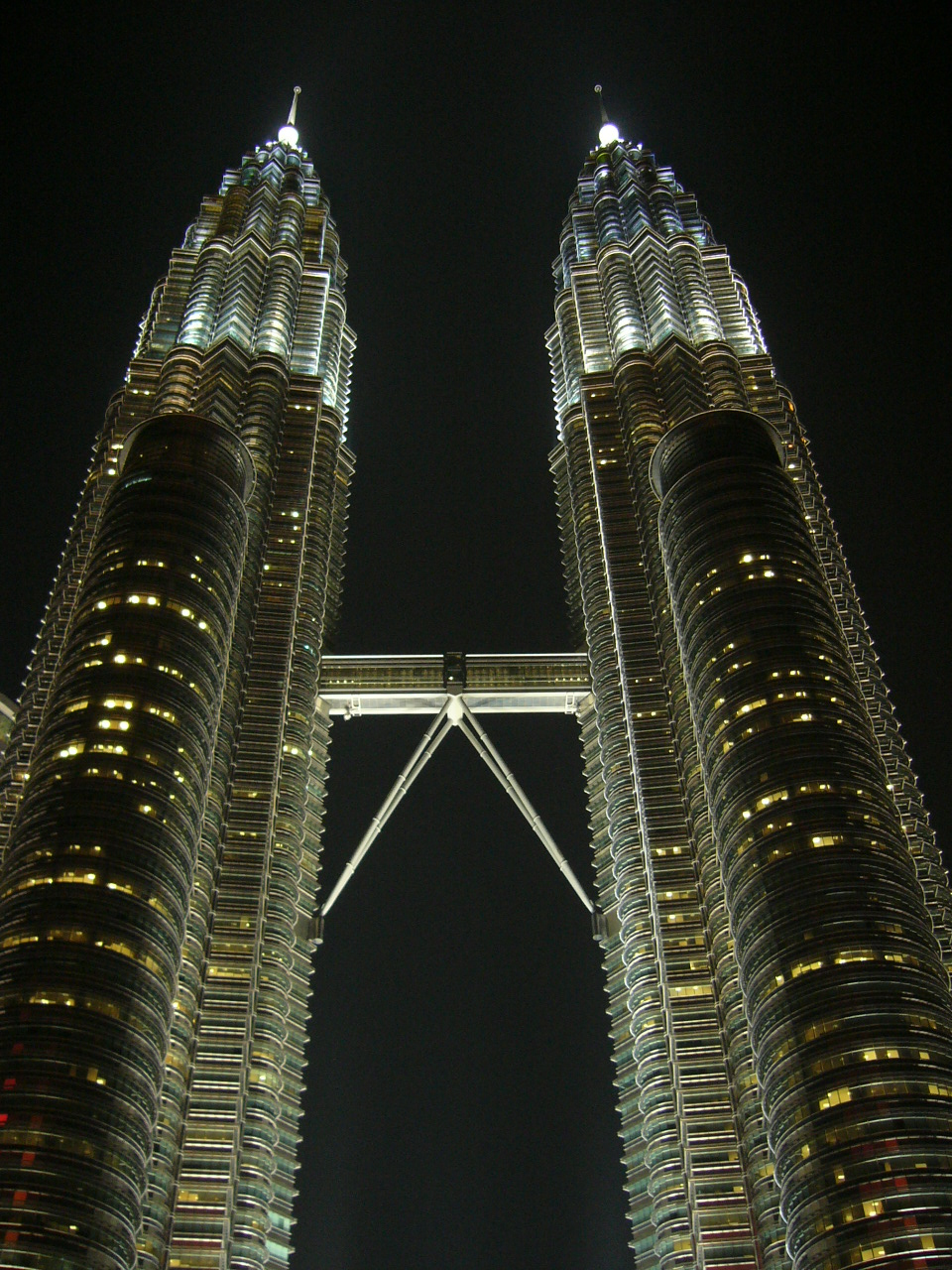
The Petronas Twin Towers, where the final heist scene takes place.

In December 1999, insurance investigator Virginia "Gin" Baker assesses the theft of a valuable Rembrandt painting from a New York City apartment. Gin informs her boss, Hector Cruz, that she suspects the involvement of world-class international thief Robert "Mac" MacDougal, an elderly man who steals for the challenge. Cruz assigns her to investigate.

In London, Mac quickly realizes that Gin is following him and confronts her. She claims to be a thief in need of Mac's help to steal a valuable Chinese mask from the highly-secure Bedford Palace. After Gin passes his test by obtaining the Palace floorplans, Mac brings her to his isolated Scottish castle to prepare. There, Gin confesses to stealing the Rembrandt, prompting Mac to reveal that he, in turn, intercepted it before it reached her client. The pair train for the heist, clashing over Mac's over-preparedness and resisting their mutual attraction. Later, unaware that Mac is listening in, Gin contacts Cruz to explain her plan to entrap Mac.

That night, Mac and Gin break into Bedford Palace and steal the mask. Before they can escape, however, Mac threatens to drown Gin if she does not admit she is trying to arrest him. Gin claims that her insurance job is a cover identity, and she has no intention of arresting him as she needs him for another heist.

In Kuala Lumpur, Gin reveals her plan to infiltrate the Malaysian branch of the International Clearance Bank (ICB) housed in the Petronas Towers. At midnight on New Year's Eve, the bank's global computer system will briefly shut down for thirty seconds to verify its integrity due to the millennium bug. During this window, Gin and Mac plan to use her custom software to siphon small amounts from thousands of corporate transactions into her account. Concerned for Gin's safety, Mac attempts to cancel the heist, but his contact, Aaron Thibadeaux, coerces him to proceed and provides Cruz with photos of Mac and Gin in an intimate moment. Cruz confronts Gin for answers, but she convinces him that it is part of her strategy to incriminate Mac.

As the Millennium celebrations commence on New Year's Eve, Cruz oversees increased security forces in the Petronas Towers. Gin and Mac hack the surveillance system to conceal their presence and break into the vault housing the ICB system. At the stroke of midnight, Gin's software successfully transfers just over $8 billion to her account, (Note: The $8 billion stolen by the pair is equivalent to $15.5 billion in 2025.) but alarms are triggered when she disconnects her laptop. She and Mac evade the pursuing forces and climb to the interlinked second tower across cables of suspended lights, but when the cable snaps, Gin loses her miniature parachute. The pair reach a large ventilation shaft and Mac forces a tearful Gin to escape with his parachute while he remains behind, promising to meet her at Pudu train station.

The following morning, Mac meets Gin at the station, accompanied by Thibadeaux, who reveals himself as a Federal Bureau of Investigation (FBI) agent. Mac confesses that he was arrested two years earlier and given a deal to avoid jail by entrapping Gin, who has long been under FBI suspicion. As a train arrives at the station, Mac reveals that he has fallen in love with Gin, and that he only surrendered $7 billion to the FBI, before slipping her a gun and documents to escape the country. Gin feigns holding Mac at gunpoint and escapes on the train, pursued by the FBI. As Mac sits at the station alone, Gin reappears, having jumped trains mid-station. Happily reunited, Gin proposes their next heist.

== Cast ==
- Sean Connery as Robert "Mac" MacDougal
- Catherine Zeta-Jones as Virginia "Gin" Baker
- Will Patton as Hector Cruz
- Maury Chaykin as Conrad Greene
- Ving Rhames as Aaron Thibadeaux
- Kevin McNally as Haas
- Terry O'Neill as Quinn
- Madhav Sharma as Security Chief
- David Yip as Chief Of Police
- Tim Potter as Millennium Man
- Rolf Saxon as Director

== Filming locations ==
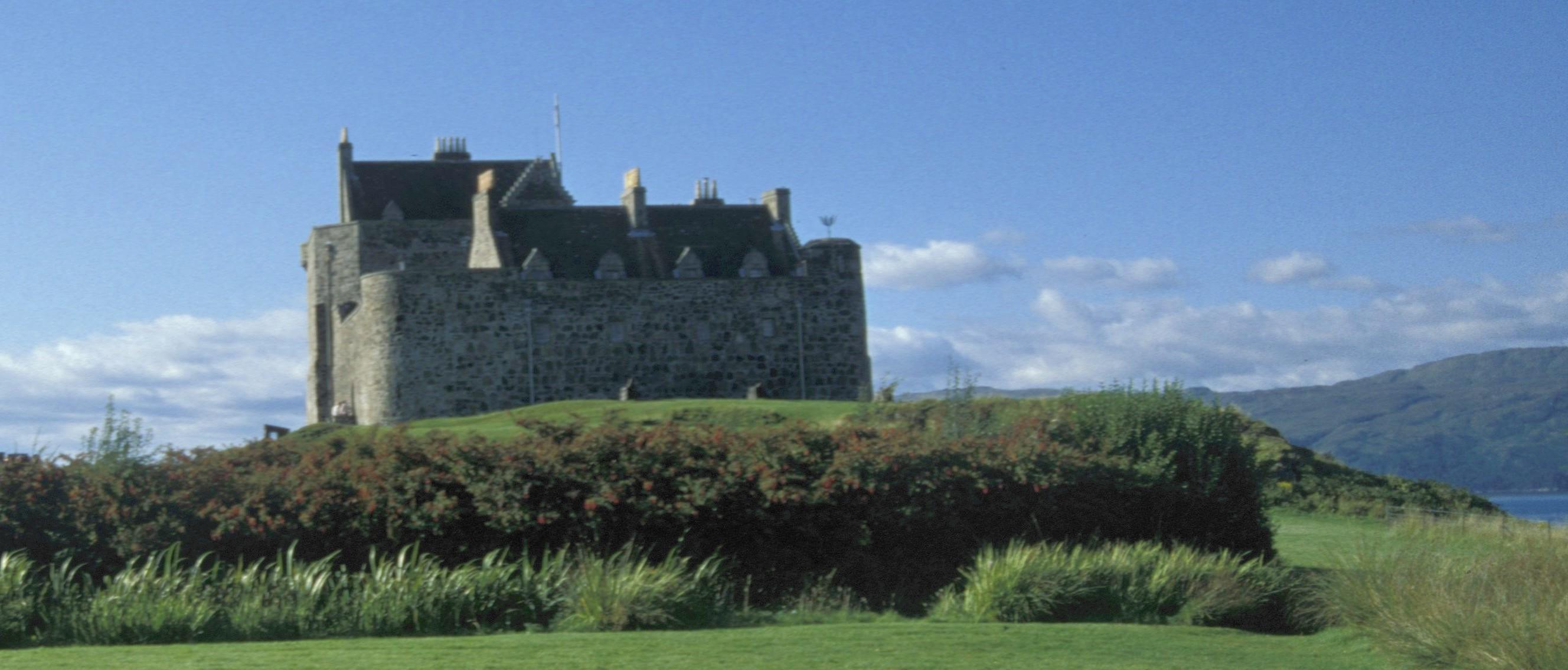
Duart Castle, the location of MacDougal's hideout.

Principal photography took place from June to October 1998. Filming locations for the film include Blenheim Palace, Savoy Hotel London, Lloyd's of London, Borough Market, London, Duart Castle on the Isle of Mull in Scotland, the Petronas Towers in Kuala Lumpur (with other filming completed at Pinewood Studios) and the Bukit Jalil LRT station. However, the signage at this station that was used for the movie was Pudu LRT station instead of Bukit Jalil.

== Reception ==
The film was a box office success, grossing $87 million in the US and $212 million worldwide. On review aggregation website Rotten Tomatoes, 40% of critics have given the film a positive review based on 85 reviews, with an average rating of 5.2/10. The site's critics consensus reads, "A poorly developed plot weighs down any potential chemistry between the movie's leads." On Metacritic, the film has a weighted average score of 54 out of 100 based on 24 critics, indicating "mixed or average" reviews. Critics such as Janet Maslin of The New York Times, New York Magazine, the Chicago Sun-Times, Variety and Desson Howe/Thomson of The Washington Post praised the film. Audiences surveyed by CinemaScore gave the film a "B" grade from an A+ to F scale.

Roger Ebert gave the film three of four stars. "It works because it is made stylishly. The plot is put together like a Swiss watch that keeps changing time zones: It is accurate and misleading at once. The film consists of one elaborate caper sequence after another, and it rivals the Bond films in its climactic action sequence. The stunt and f/x work here does a good job... Most of the movie's action is just that—action—and not extreme violence." Ebert noted about Zeta-Jones, "I can only reflect, as I did while watching her in "The Mask Of Zorro," that while beautiful women are a dime a dozen in the movies, those with fire, flash and humor are a good deal more scarce." "There's a tummy-churning tradition of pensionable movie blokes getting paired up with beautiful babes..." complained OK! in its review. "We barely believed Sean and Michelle Pfeiffer in The Russia House; a decade later, Sean and Catherine Zeta-Jones? You gotta be kidding. The film's alright-ish."

=== Responses from the Malaysian government ===
Following Entrapment's release in June 1999, the Malaysian Prime Minister Mahathir Mohamad accused the film of presenting a distorted image of Malaysia. Mahathir took issue with the film splicing images of the Petronas Twin Towers with slums from Malacca. The Malaysian Government had assisted Twentieth Century Fox with visa processing, customs clearance, telecommunications and security in a bid to promote Malaysia as a film location.
