= Pudu LRT station =

Railway station in Pudu, Kuala Lumpur, Malaysia

Coordinates: 3°8′5.8″N 101°42′43.2″E

AG10 SP10 Pudu
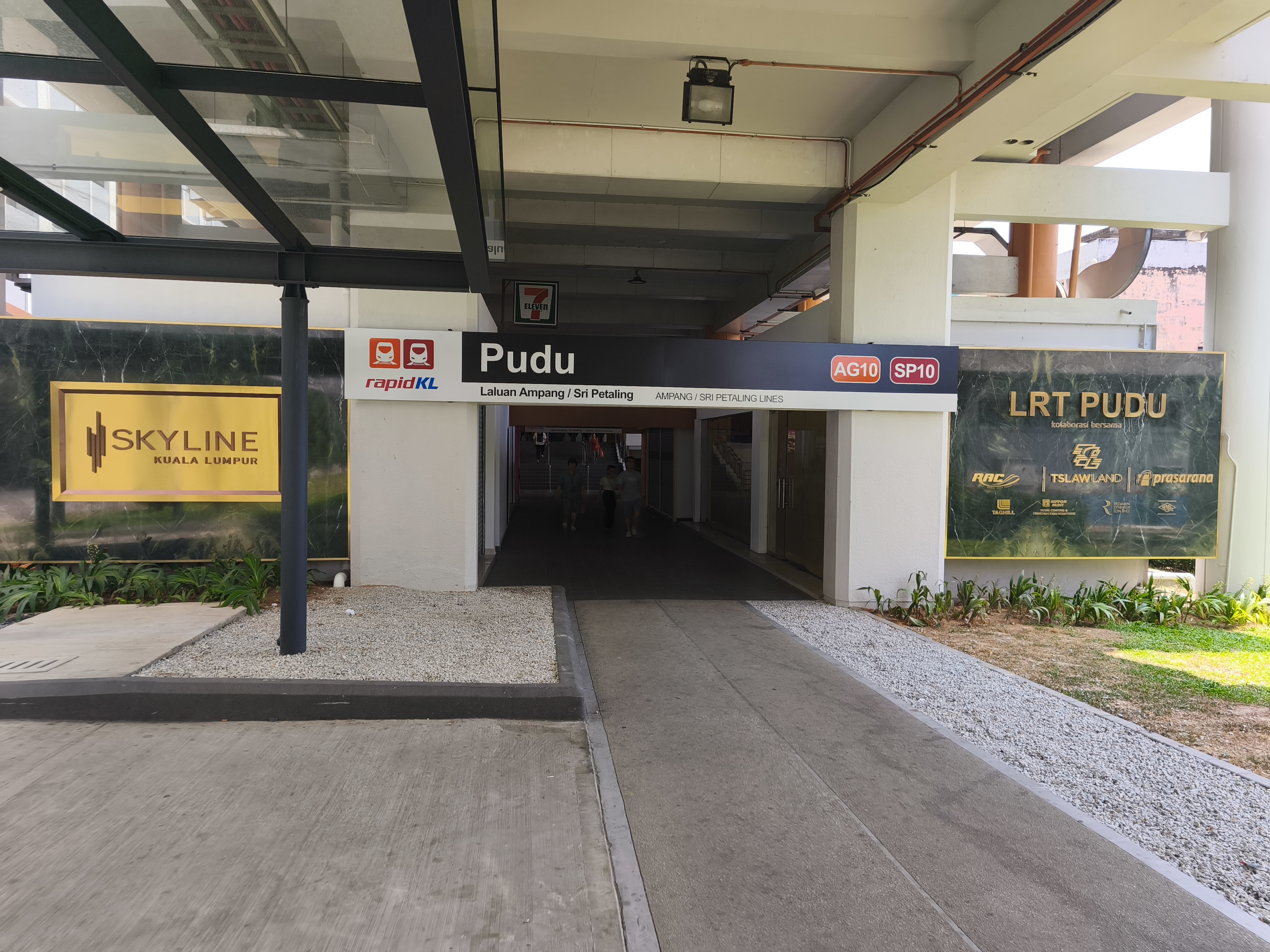
- Main wide view of the station entrance from Skyline KL

General information
- Other names: Malay: ڤودو (Jawi); Chinese: 半山芭; Tamil: புடு
- Location: Pudu LRT Station, Jalan Sarawak, Pudu; 55200 Kuala Lumpur; Malaysia
- System: Rapid KL
- Owner: Prasarana Malaysia
- Operator: Rapid Rail
- Lines: 3 Ampang Line; 4 Sri Petaling Line
- Platforms: 2 side platforms
- Tracks: 2

Construction
- Structure type: Elevated
- Parking: Available
- Cycle facilities: Available, 20 bicycle bays.
- Accessible: Available

Other information
- Station code: AG10 SP10

History
- Opened: 3 : 16 December 1996; 29 years ago; 4 11 July 1998; 28 years ago

Services
Preceding station		Following station
Hang Tuah towards Sentul Timur	Ampang Line	Chan Sow Lin towards Ampang
Hang Tuah towards Sentul Timur	Sri Petaling Line	Chan Sow Lin towards Putra Heights
Location

Pudu LRT station is an elevated light rapid transit (LRT) station situated in Pudu, Kuala Lumpur, Malaysia. The station serves a single line that is shared by both the Ampang & Sri Petaling Lines. The station was opened on 16 December 1996, as part of the first phase of the former STAR LRT system's opening, alongside 13 adjoining stations along the Ampang-Sultan Ismail route.

== Location ==
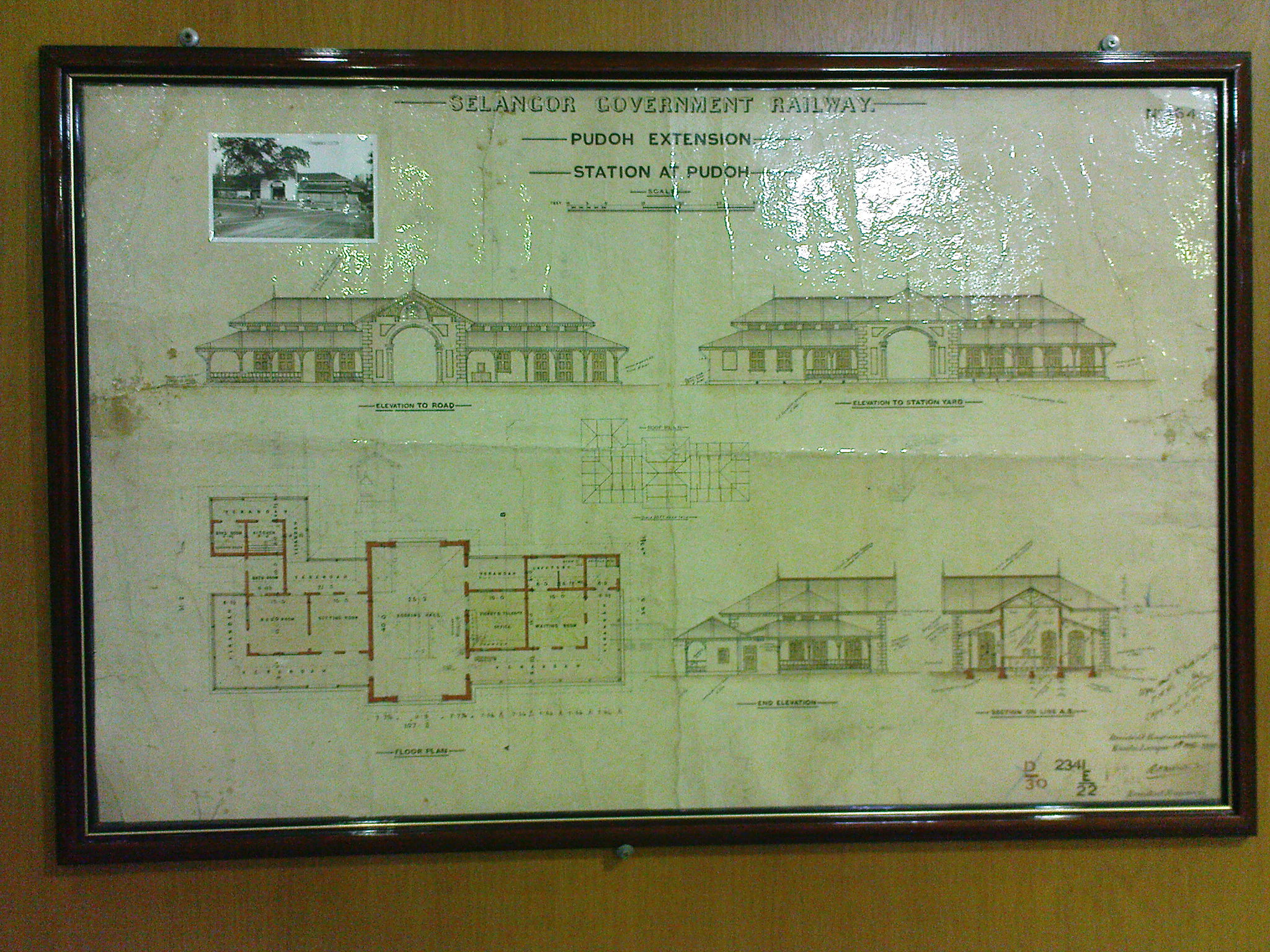
The former Pudoh (Pudu) railway station of Keretapi Tanah Melayu (KTM)

The station is located on the western fringe of the incorporated town of Pudu, along Jalan Sarawak, an alleyway northeast from the station, behind a row of shophouses afront Jalan Pudu, a main thoroughfare in Pudu. The station is also accessible via Jalan San Peng through Skyline KL from the southwest and Jalan Sungai Besi from the southeast.

As parts of the Ampang and Sri Petaling Lines route reused the now defunct Federated Malay States Railways (FMSR) and Keretapi Tanah Melayu (KTM) line between Kuala Lumpur, Ampang and Salak Selatan, the Pudu station serves as an unofficial replacement of an older Pudoh station that was formerly located in roughly the same location, closed in 1993 and demolished outright during the 1990s as the STAR LRT line was constructed in place of the railway tracks. The station is one of three Ampang and Sri Petaling Lines stations serving the Pudu area, the other being the Hang Tuah and Chan Sow Lin.

== Design ==
While the original KTM railway line that the Ampang and Sri Petaling Lines routes were based on was laid out on street level, the immediate line adjoining the Pudu LRT station and the station itself are elevated. A reason for this was the proximity of a former level crossing at Jalan Sungai Besi, southeast from the station. The density of the area meant that an elevated railway line was more feasible than a road bridge or railway bridge in order to bypass road traffic and avoid unnecessary stoppages for road users. The tracks follow the route of the old railway line.

The station was designed in a two-tier layout, with a raised ticketing area and staff rooms on the lower floor, and the two side platforms and tracks on the top floor. Both platforms converge at the ticket area via stairways and escalators. Elevators were installed some several years after the opening of the station. The principal styling of the station is like most other stations on the Ampang and Sri Petaling Lines, featuring multi-tiered roofs supported by latticed frames, and white plastered walls and pillars.

== Locality landmarks ==
- Skyline KL (directly beside the station)
- Hotel Pudu Plaza
- Pudu Fire & Rescue Station
- Various schools, restaurants, and shops

== Station Features ==
The station adopts the standard elevated station design for the Ampang and Sri Petaling Lines, with two side platforms above the concourse level.

=== Layout ===
L2	Platform; Level	Side platform, doors will open on the left
L2	Platform; Level	→ Platform 1: 3 Ampang Line / 4 Sri Petaling Line towards AG01 SP01 Sentul Timur (Hang Tuah)
L2	Platform; Level	← Platform 2: 3 Ampang Line towards AG18 Ampang (Chan Sow Lin) ← Platform 2: 4 Sri Petaling Line towards SP31 Putra Heights (Chan Sow Lin)
L2	Platform; Level	Side platform, doors will open on the left
L1	Concourse; Level	Ticketing machines, faregates to paid area, escalators, lifts, kiosks, customer service counter
G	Ground; Level	Park N' Ride, Feeder Bus Stop, Taxi Lay-By

=== Entrances and exits ===
The station has one main entrance/exit to and from the concourse area, which then splits leading into different destinations.

Ampang Line & Sri Petaling Line station
Entrance	Location	Destination	Picture
A	Pudu Station	Skyline KL, Jalan Sarawak, Jalan Sungai Besi	

== In popular culture ==
The station was featured by name in the 1999 film Entrapment starring Sean Connery and Catherine Zeta-Jones. Despite it being the Bukit Jalil LRT station actually used as the filming location, the sign there showed "Pudu" instead of "Bukit Jalil", though both stations are situated on the same line (under the Sri Petaling line portion).

== Gallery ==
The station's entrance with the old station code and Chinese New Year decorations in February 2024

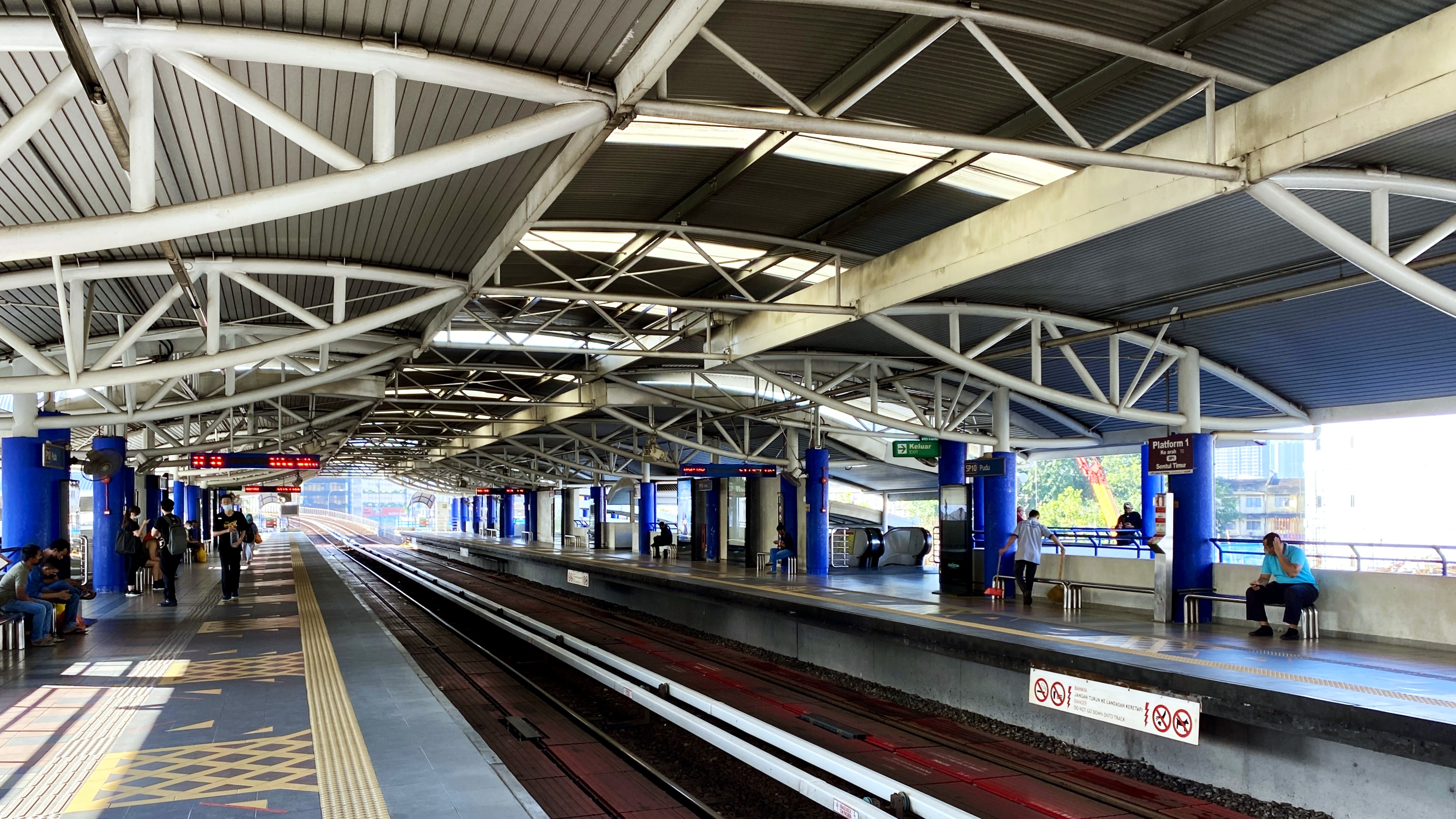
The station's platform in 2023

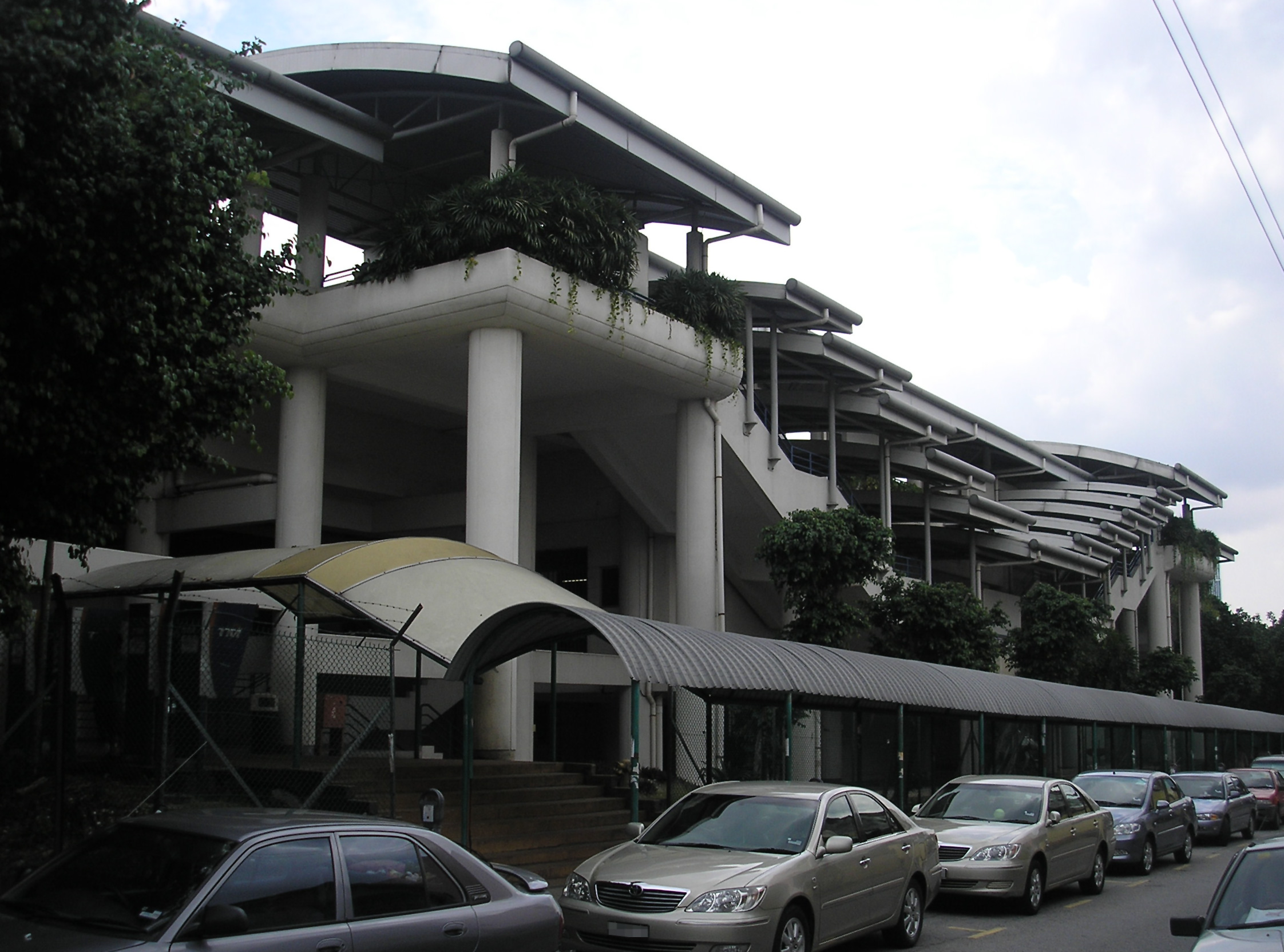
The station's side exterior view in 2007

== See also ==
- List of rail transit stations in Klang Valley
