= Senang Hati Foundation =

Indonesian disability organization

- Founded: 2003
- Type: Humanitarian Foundation
- Location: Bali, Indonesia
- Method: Skills training, social mainstreaming, materials assistance, housing
- Members: 150+
- Key people: Putu Suriati, Founder and Chairperson
- Website: Official website
- Affiliated with de Stichting Kinderpostzegels Nederland and Liliane Fonds

The Senang Hati Foundation, also known as Yayasan Senang Hati, is a non-profit organization in Bali that assists people living with disabilities. The name Senang Hati loosely translates as "Happy Hearts" in Indonesian. The foundation creates programmes to develop self-confidence, physical and economic independence, and increase awareness in the general community of the rights of people with disabilities. Senang Hati accomplishes this through the assistance of volunteers, who provide skills training and social interaction. The society also provides wheelchairs and housing, and runs Senang Hati Places, a home for disabled children.

== History ==
After contracting polio at a young age, Putu Suriati, the founder of the Senang Hati Foundation, lost the use of her legs. While house-bound, Suriati was taught to paint by her uncle, and she was able to make a living selling her works to tourists–until the mid-1980s, when competition made painting unprofitable for Suriati. Things changed in 1989, when she was given a wheelchair by Judy Slattum. The wheelchair gave her increased mobility, allowing her to leave her parents' house, and giving her the opportunity to join with other female painters in Bali to form the Seniwati Gallery.

In 2000 Suriati held an exhibition of her work at the Bali Beach Hotel. At this exhibition Suriati met a number of other people with disabilities, and this led to the development of an informal network with others suffering from disabilities, which encompassed visits, activities, and excursions. With Vern Cork's arrival, (an Australian who was similarly a wheelchair user), the program was expanded, and grew to the point where they contacted the Bali Hati Foundation for assistance.

With the help of the Bali Hati Foundation, the Senang Hati Foundation was established through a notary as a non-profit organization. In 2003, the foundation moved into a vacant school through a five-year lease donated by American businessman Glen Adams.

== Aims ==
As described on their website, The Senang Hati Foundation aims to:

1. Meet with disabled individuals and lift them out of their social isolation
2. Provide technical assistance to achieve physical independence
3. Build confidence in those with disabilities by providing them with a normal social life
4. Build self-confidence through assertiveness training
5. Teach skills that will enable members to become self-supporting (in particular, skills such as painting, sewing, and woodwork)

A primary function of the center is to seek out disabled people in Bali and provide friendship and assistance, in order to help them to move out of isolation from the wider community and into integration with society.

== Background ==
Non-profit organisations such as Senang Hati are important in Indonesia, as government funding for handicapped people is limited. Without assistance from the private sector, many disabled Balinese people, including children, remain marginalized, thus limited from benefitting from or contributing to society. In many parts of Indonesia, and certainly in Hindu Bali, having a disabled child is evidence of bad karma.

Many people believe that the child is being punished and a "bad" spirit of a deceased ancestor has been reincarnated in the child. Hence, a disabled child is a disgrace to the family. In the past these children were often hidden away in back rooms, were never sent to school, and received little or no medical care. Attitudes are changing but it is still not uncommon to come upon children, and sometimes even adults, who have been isolated in this way.

== Activities ==
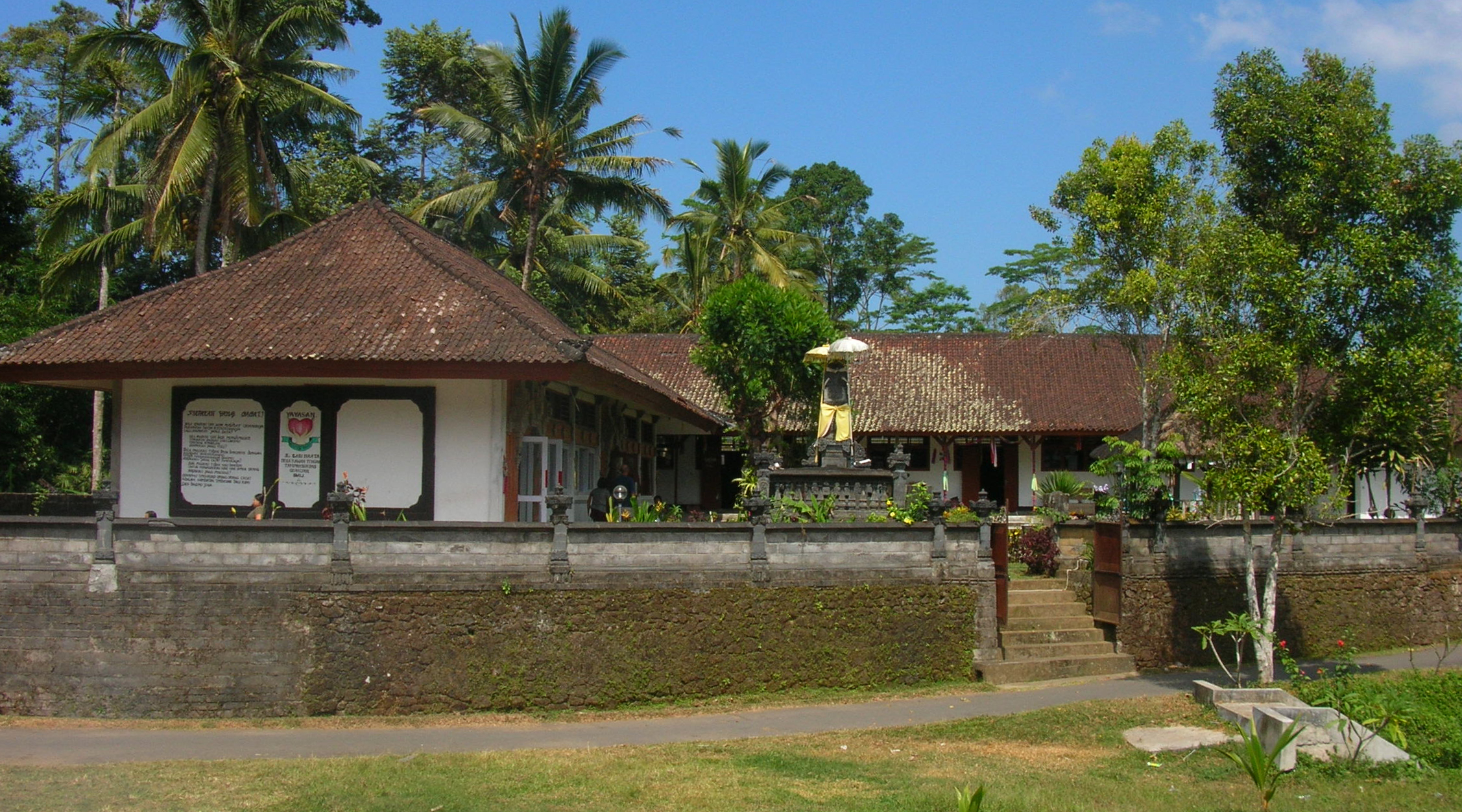
Senang Hati's Centre in Tampaksiring, Bali

Through the assistance of volunteers, the foundation provides classes in reading and writing Indonesian, job skills, art, and handicrafts (some of which are sold to provide a small income for the handicapped students). Some of the disabled who have received artistic training have later gone on to become accomplished painters, most notably the five artists Wayan Tono, Wayan Damai, Putu Suriati, Ageng Sudin, and Holis Sudin.

Senang Hati, with the help of organizations such as the Wheelchair Foundation, has provided wheelchairs to people with disabilities. In addition, the foundation provides a physical therapist and an audiometrist who visit and treat patients.

The organization provides housing to more than twenty disabled people who would have difficulty living independently. The center is free for short term housing, but of those who stay at the center long-term, a small contribution is requested.

In partnership with other organizations, Senang Hati can help provide other forms of assistance when it is required, such as the payment of school fees in conjunction with the Dutch organization Stichting WINS.

== Funding and operation ==
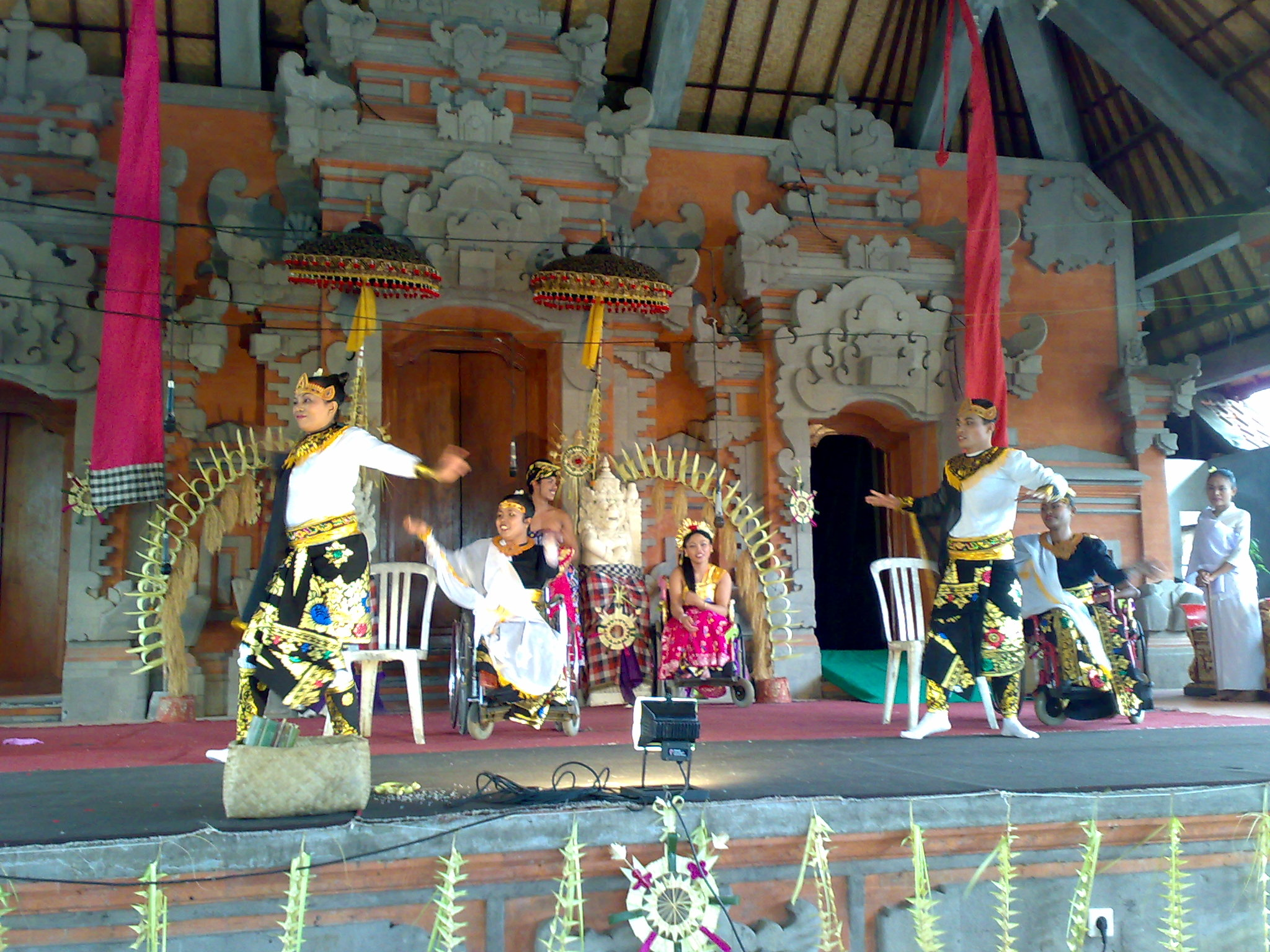
Members of the Senang Hati Foundation performing Diah Larasati A Drama & Dance Performance in Ubud, Bali. This is the Wheelchair Dance.

Volunteers are a major source of assistance for the foundation. The center relies upon travelers who are willing to share their time for at least a week. Most of these volunteers are either British or Dutch.

The Senang Hati Foundation relies heavily on donations from both individuals and organizations, such as Stichting Kinderpostzegels Nederland and the Liliane Fonds. More specific assistance is provided by organizations such as the Wheelchair Foundation and various Rotary Clubs. As well being funded through donations, Senang Hati operates an art gallery and shop at their center in Tampaksiring, Bali, where crafts produced by the disabled are sold.

Other fundraisers include dramatic productions: the 2008 production of Diah Larasati served both to raise funds for the foundation and to disseminate information about the rights of disabled children to attend school.

== See also ==
- Smile Foundation of Bali
