= Ronald Bass =

American writer and producer (born 1942)

- Born: Ronald Jay Bass; March 26, 1942 (age 84); Los Angeles, California, U.S.
- Education: Stanford University (BA); Yale University (MA); Harvard University (JD)
- Occupations: Screenwriter, film producer
- Notable work: Rain Man
- Awards: Academy Award for Best Original Screenplay; Rain Man (1988)

Ronald Jay Bass (born March 26, 1942), sometimes credited as Ron Bass, is an American screenwriter and film producer. He won an Academy Award for writing the screenplay for Barry Levinson's film Rain Man, and films that Bass is associated with are regularly nominated for multiple motion picture awards. His films have grossed over $2 billion.

== Life and career ==
Bass was born in Los Angeles, California. From the age of 3 to 11, Bass was afflicted with an undiagnosed condition that kept him bedridden. His symptoms included respiratory problems and stomach pains with high fevers and nausea. It was during this illness, at age six, that Bass is said to have started writing.

During his teens, Bass began work on a novel, which he entitled Voleur. He completed this work at age 17 and showed it to his English teacher. He took her critique of his first completed project quite hard. She described the writing as very good, but she felt that it was too personal to be published. Bass's response was to later burn his manuscript. Later in life, Bass recalled "it was like the voice of God telling me I didn't have what it takes to be a writer, and I should find something practical to do with my life". Bass would revisit his teenage writings later in life.

Bass entered law studies, first at Stanford, then Yale, and finally at Harvard Law School, where he graduated in 1967 with a degree in law. He seemed quite confident about his future prospects, saying, "When I learned there was such a thing as entertainment law, I thought, 'This is where I belong'". Back in Los Angeles, Bass began a seventeen-year career practicing law in the entertainment business. He was successful, and eventually rose to the level of partner in his law firm.

Bass has worked with his sister Diane Bass, who served as an uncredited technical consultant on the film Rain Man.

As he moved up the career ladder in law, the love of writing that Bass had acquired as a child never left him. He started writing again, usually during the predawn hours before going to work. Writing and working at unusual hours became a lifelong habit of his. In 1974, he began to rework his novel Voleur, apparently from memory, as he had burned the manuscript in a fit of pique when he was 17. In 1978, he completed the work, renaming it The Perfect Thief (ISBN 0-515-04622-1). This was the first of his three published novels. In 1982, Bass published his second novel, Lime's crisis: A novel (ISBN 0-688-01025-3). The Lime referred to in the title is Harry Lime, the central mystery character of the 1949 motion picture The Third Man. On January 1, 1984, his third novel was published, The Emerald Illusion (ISBN 0-688-02622-2). The following year, he wrote the screenplay Code Name: Emerald, based on this novel. It was his debut as a screenwriter with a produced script.

As a screenwriter, Bass is known for successfully working in collaboration with other writers, including Amy Tan on The Joy Luck Club and Al Franken on When a Man Loves a Woman. He also collaborated on the script for the 2022 film The King's Daughter.. In 2025, Ron Bass, Jay Paul Deratany and Sonia Kifferstein co-wrote the feature film 21 Down a true story starring Ashley Judd.

Ron is currently under contract to write an original Screenplay entitled "Pegasus" for Pegasus Productions Corp.

== "The Ronettes" ==
A small controversy has arisen over Bass's use of assistants to help him write screenplays. While it is common for screenwriters to employ assistants to help them with research and typing, Bass employs six or seven mostly female assistants that one journalist dubbed "The Ronettes". According to Bass, his assistants help him in research and also in critiquing his scripts. They enable him to write, revise, or polish a comparatively large number of screenplays each year.

== Works ==
=== Novels ===
- The Perfect Thief, 1978, ISBN 0-515-04622-1
- Lime's crisis: A novel, 1982, ISBN 0-688-01025-3
- The Emerald Illusion, January 1, 1984, ISBN 0-688-02622-2

=== Films ===
Film	Year	Writing Credit	Producing Credit	Alternate Name Credit	Additional information
Code Name: Emerald	1985	Screenplay			Adapted from his novel The Emerald Illusion
Gardens of Stone	1987	Screenplay			
Black Widow	1987	Written			
Rain Man	1988	Screenplay			Academy Award for Best Original Screenplay
Sleeping with the Enemy	1991	Screenplay			
The Joy Luck Club	1993	Screenplay	Producer		
Reunion	1994	Teleplay			Made-for-television
When a Man Loves a Woman	1994	Written	Executive producer		Role as "AA Man #1"
The Enemy Within	1994	Teleplay		as Ron Bass	Made-for-television
Waiting to Exhale	1995	Screenplay	Executive producer		
Dangerous Minds	1995	Screenplay			
My Best Friend's Wedding	1997	Written	Producer		
Stepmom	1998	Screenplay	Executive producer	as Ron Bass	
What Dreams May Come	1998	Screenplay	Executive producer	as Ron Bass	
How Stella Got Her Groove Back	1998	Screenplay	Executive producer	as Ron Bass	
Snow Falling on Cedars	1999	Screenplay	Producer	as Ron Bass	
Entrapment	1999	Story & screenplay	Executive producer	as Ron Bass	
Swing Vote	1999	Written		as Ron Bass	Made-for-television
Invisible Child	1999	Story		as Ron Bass	Made-for-television
Border Line	1999	Story & teleplay		as Ron Bass	Made-for-television
Passion of Mind	2000	Written	Producer	as Ron Bass	
The Lazarus Child	2004	Screenplay	Executive producer		
Mozart and the Whale	2005	Written	Producer	as Ron Bass	
Amelia	2009	Screenplay	Executive producer		
Snow Flower and the Secret Fan	2011	Screenplay			
Before We Go	2014	Screenplay			
Persuasion	2022	Screenplay			
Pegasus	2022	Screenplay			
Bau: Artist at War	2025	Screenplay			
