= Yayasan Kemanusiaan Ibu Pertiwi =

Indonesian non-profit organization

Yayasan Kemanusiaan Ibu Pertiwi (YKIP), or "Humanitarian Foundation for Mother Earth", is an Indonesian non-profit organization dedicated to operating health and education programs in Bali. The charity was founded in the wake of the 2002 Bali bombings that left 255 people dead and 446 injured. It was cited by Coconuts Bali as one of ten charities doing "amazing work in Bali".

== History ==
Yayasan Kemanusiaan Ibu Pertiwi (YKIP) was established on 12 October 2002, as a response to the 2002 Bali bombings. The initial organization was the Bali Recovery Group, which spent the first six months after the bombing providing support to the various NGOs who came in to help with the relief operations.

In 2003, YKIP began focusing exclusively on helping the victims of the 2002 incident. After the victims' basic necessities were fulfilled, YKIP started to focus on health and education issues, and conducted projects aimed at those living in poverty in Bali.

== Office ==
Mitrais, an IT company with its head office in Bali, supported YKIP from its foundation, providing office space, accounting support, IT, internet, and other forms of assistance. The senior staff of Mitrais are the members of the board of YKIP. In July 2007, YKIP had its own fully furnished and equipped office in the back of Mitrais' office in Kuta.
