= Sultan Street railway station =

Railway station in Kuala Lumpur, Malaysia

Coordinates: 3.145584°N 101.700°E

Sultan Street Jalan Sultan

General information
- Location: Jalan Pudu, Kuala Lumpur; Malaysia
- Owner: Keretapi Tanah Melayu
- Line: Ampang Line
- Platforms: 2 side platforms
- Tracks: 2

Construction
- Structure type: At-grade

History
- Opened: 1892
- Closed: 1972

Former services
Preceding station	Keretapi Tanah Melayu	Following station
Kuala Lumpur Terminus	Ampang Line	Pudu towards Salak Selatan or Ampang
Location

Sultan Street railway station was a railway station located at the intersection of Jalan Sultan, Jalan Pudu and Jalan Tun Tan Cheng Lock, in Kuala Lumpur, Malaysia.

The station was opened in 1892 and was initially a through station on the line from (the later location of) Kuala Lumpur railway station to Ampang. The track from Kuala Lumpur ran through the middle of Foch Avenue (currently Jalan Tun Tan Cheng Lock), but this section was closed after some time. Now a terminus, Sultan Street station remained accessible from the main line via a junction at what is now Salak Selatan Komuter station. A new station building was constructed for the terminus station.

The station's closure date is unknown, but it is still shown on the 1962 official Malayan topographical survey map. Moreover, the station was noted as having a diesel railcar service to Seremban railway station, which was affected by a railway strike in December 1962. Multiple services per day to Ampang were still running in 1965, when another strike disrupted them. On 6 June 1967, the station was the scene of protests which were dispersed by police. In 1969, the station was still open, as it was reported train tickets could be bought here for KTM services.

The train station has been closed in 1972 to make way to the Pudu Sentral, which is opened in 1976.

The railway alignments to Salak Selatan and Ampang have been re-used in the late 1990s for the Ampang and Sri Petaling lines. The current nearest station to Sultan Street station's location is Plaza Rakyat LRT station. The station was located next to the still standing Wesley Methodist Church.
