= Merdeka Textile Museum =

Museum in Kuala Lumpur, Malaysia

- Muzium Tekstil Merdeka
- Established: August 21, 2026
- Location: Kuala Lumpur, Malaysia
- Coordinates: 3°08′21.0624″N 101°41′57.822″E
- Type: Textile museum
- Director: Suryani Senja Alias
- Public transit access: MR3 Maharajalela station
- Website: Official website

The Merdeka Textile Museum (Malay: Muzium Tekstil Negara) is a textile museum in Kuala Lumpur, Malaysia located within the Merdeka 118 precinct. The museum opens Tuesday to Sunday from 10 am to 6 pm.

== History and overview ==
The museum is part of the masterplan for the Merdeka 118 precinct. Located within the Look at 118 building, the museum was initially slated to open in 2023 alongside a cafe and a gift shop. The museum has 8 galleries and a study centre that features a conservation laboratory, fabric library and textile knowledge centre. The museum serves to bring cultural elements and as a tourist attraction to the precinct.

Side view of the museum

The museum was launched by the Queen of Malaysia, Raja Zarith Sofiah on 21 August 2026, and was initially open to visitors by appointment only. The museum officially opened for ticketed admissions and walk-ins on 1 October 2026.

The museum has received visits by members of the royalty, prominent Malaysian figures and foreign dignitaries. On 17 November 2026, during an official visit by the French President Emmanuel Macron, his spouse Brigitte Macron accompanied by the spouse of the Malaysian Prime Minister Wan Azizah Wan Ismail and the Federal Territories Minister Hannah Yeoh visited the museum. The museum was also visited by the Sultan of Selangor Sharafuddin Idris Shah and his spouse Tengku Permaisuri Norashikin on 18 November 2026.

== Exhibitions ==
The museum features eight themed galleries. Inspired by an eight petal flower motif called Bunga Pecah Lapan, the galleries each display different aspects of Malay textiles, their history, function and role in communities. Among the textiles featured in the museum's collection include batik, chindai and telepuk. The key attraction of the museum is a personal collection of Azah Aziz that comprises 240 traditional garments and 69 pieces of classic jewellery. The museum utilises traditional displays, digital technology, interactive installations and augmented reality in their exhibits.

The eight galleries are;

- Object and Natural Culture (Budaya Benda dan Alam)
- The Universal Malay World (Dunia Melayu Sejagat)
- Motifs, Patterns, Meanings and Symbols (Motif, Corak, Makna dan Simbol)
- Techniques and Craftsmanship (Teknik dan Pertukangan)
- Power and Politics (Kuasa dan Politik)
- Purity and Spirituality (Kesucian dan Kerohanian)
- Continuity of Textiles (Kesinambungan Tekstil)
- Future of Textiles (Masa Depan Tekstil)

== Transportation ==
Pathway to the museum through Merdeka Boulevard at 118

The museum is accessible from the Maharajalela Monorail station on the KL Monorail. It is also connected to Merdeka MRT station and Plaza Rakyat LRT station through the Merdeka Boulevard at 118, which is the precinct's linear park.

== See also ==
- List of museums in Malaysia
- Merdeka 118
- Merdeka Precinct
- National Textile Museum
