= 118 Mall =

Shopping mall in Kuala Lumpur, Malaysia

Coordinates: 3°08′28.7″N 101°42′06.6″E

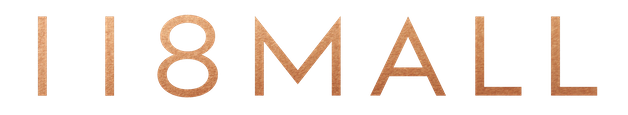

- 118 Mall along Jalan Hang Jebat
- Location: Jalan Hang Jebat, Kuala Lumpur, Malaysia
- Opened: 1 November 2026
- Previous names: MERDEKA @ 118, Warisan Merdeka Mall
- Owner: PNB Merdeka Ventures Sdn Bhd
- Architect: Fender Katsalidis
- Num. of stores: 328+ stores and 12 cinema halls
- Floor area: 1,000,000 sq ft (93,000 m^{2})
- Floors: 7
- Parking: 20,000+
- Public transit: KG17 Merdeka MRT station AG8 SP8 Plaza Rakyat LRT station
- Website: www.118mall-kl.com//

118 Mall, previously known as MERDEKA @ 118 and Warisan Merdeka Mall, is a seven-storey glass domed shopping mall located in the Merdeka 118 Precinct of Kuala Lumpur, Malaysia.

The name "118" was derived from the number of floors in the Merdeka 118 tower which has a total of 118 floors. The mall is developed and owned by PNB Merdeka Ventures Sdn Bhd, a wholly owned subsidiary of Permodalan Nasional Berhad (PNB), which is also the developer for the Merdeka 118. The mall is situated at the foot of the tower and will directly serve its entire precinct.

The mall was opened to the public on 1 November 2026, 11.18 am (MST).

== Background ==
The developer had awarded the contract to build a shopping complex as part of the Merdeka 118 development at the former site of Merdeka Park, formerly the second oldest public park in Kuala Lumpur, to a joint-venture between WCT Holdings Berhad and TSR Capital Berhad. The mall is planned to be surrounded by 4-acre of greenery and a linear park called Merdeka Boulevard At 118, which connects the Maharajalela Monorail station and the mall. Construction works on the building as well as the shopping mall began in 2014 and opened on 1 November 2026.

== Design ==
Glass dome

A glass dome was constructed as the roof of the mall to bring in filtered natural light into the centre of the mall. While the mall's organic theme was to have sculptural design-story elements and water-features based on Malaysian culture.

== Features ==
Malaysian Artisan District

=== Key features of the mall ===
- Eat Street – local and international al fresco restaurants offering all-day dining and after-hours hangout spots
- The Atmosphere – a large, bright and inviting area for hosting a wide variety of events and exhibitions
- The Dome – the largest shopping mall dome in Malaysia
- The Raincloud – a dramatic multi-storey water feature with an interactive screen offering customised messages
- Malaysian Artisan District – a curated retail floor dedicated to Malaysian cuisine and heritage products

== Transportation ==
Entrance to 118 Mall from Merdeka MRT Station

The mall is directly connected to the Merdeka MRT station on the MRT Kajang Line located along Jalan Hang Jebat, which is also an interchange and is connected with the Plaza Rakyat LRT station on the LRT Ampang and Sri Petaling Lines.

The Hang Tuah station, served by the Ampang and Sri Petaling Lines as well as the KL Monorail, is a 600 metres (0.37 mi) walk southeast.

The mall is also accessible from the Maharajalela Monorail station on the KL Monorail, connected through the Merdeka Boulevard at 118.

== Gallery ==
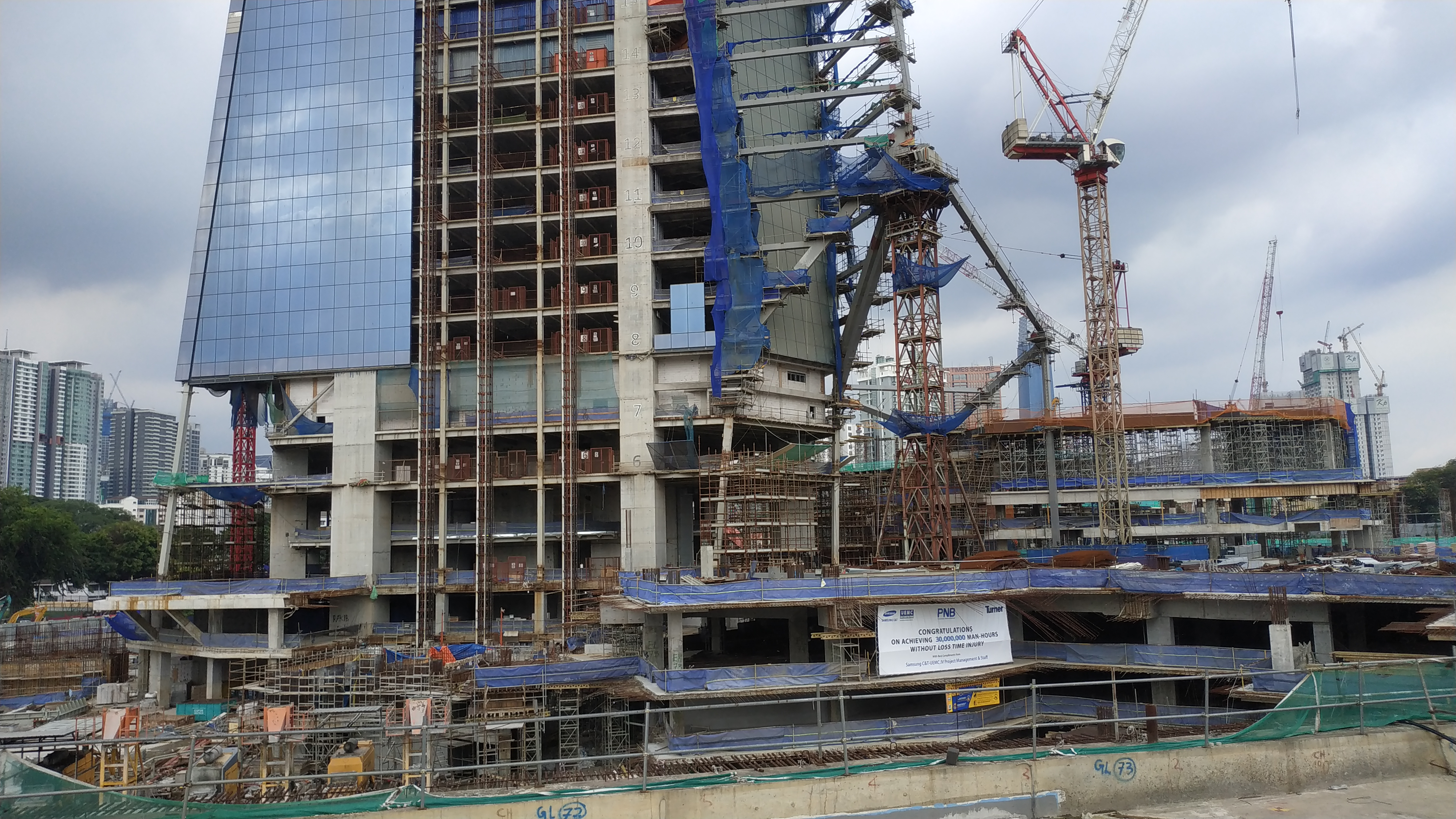
Construction site as of May 2020

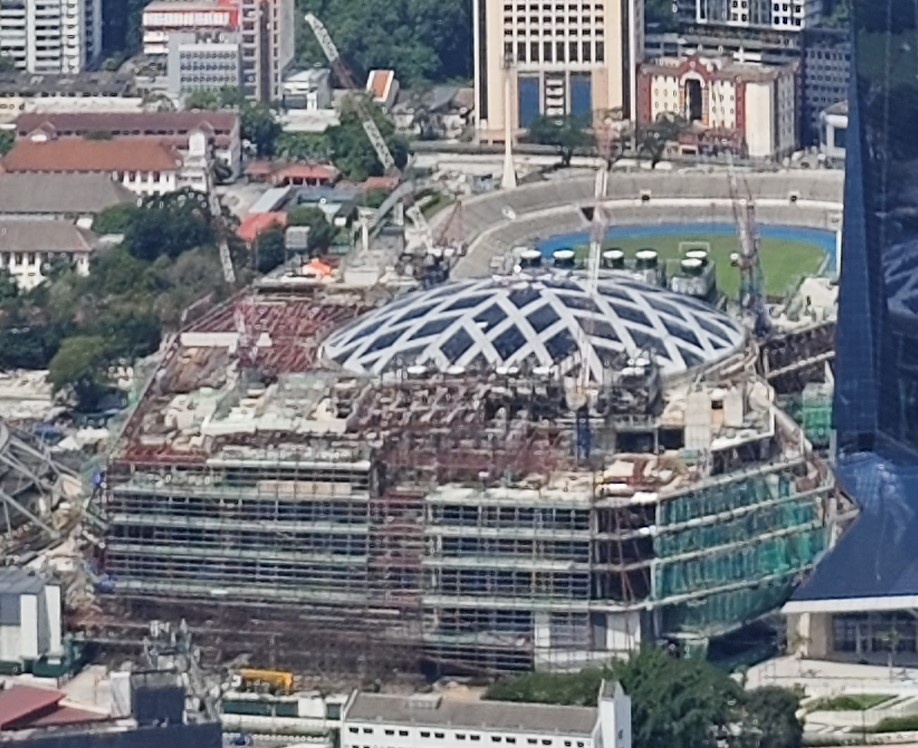
Construction site as of June 2024

View of Merdeka Boulevard at 118 from 118 Mall

== See also ==
- List of shopping malls in Malaysia
- Merdeka 118
- Merdeka 118 Precinct
- The Exchange TRX
- Petronas Towers
- Suria KLCC
- Pavilion Kuala Lumpur
- Berjaya Times Square
- Exchange 106
- BBCC
