= Jalan Pudu =

Road in Malaysia

Major junctions
- Northwest end: Pudu Sentral roundabout
- Jalan Tun Perak; Jalan Cheng Lock; Jalan Bukit Bintang; Kuala Lumpur Inner Ring Road; Kuala Lumpur Middle Ring Road 1 Jalan Tun Razak; Jalan Chan Sow Lin; Jalan Cheras Lama
- Southeast end: Jalan Chan Sow Lin junctions

Location
- Country: Malaysia
- Primary destinations: Pudu

Highway system
- Highways in Malaysia; Expressways; Federal; State

Jalan Pudu is a major road in Kuala Lumpur, Malaysia. According to the Department of Survey and Mapping, Kuala Lumpur is divided into sections and into smaller lots. A map of Kuala Lumpur from 1895 places Pudu (or Pudoh, as it was back then) in a vast swampy area far from the administrative capital where Sultan Abdul Samad Building still stands.

== List of interchanges and junctions ==
km	Exit	Junctions	To	Remarks
		Pudu Sentral Roundabout	Northwest; Jalan Tun Perak (Jalan Mountbatten); Jalan Raja Laut; Jalan Parlimen Southwest; Jalan Cheng Lock (Foch Avenue); Petaling Street; Jalan Tun Sambanthan	Junctions
Jalan Pudu
		Pudu Sentral	3 4 Plaza Rakyat LRT station 9 Merdeka MRT station	
		Plaza Rakyat		
		Tung Shin Hospital		
		Swiss Garden Hotel		
		Jalan Bukit Bintang	East; Jalan Bukit Bintang	No entry
		Jalan Hang Tuah	Kuala Lumpur Inner Ring Road; Jalan Hang Tuah; Northeast; Jalan Imbi; Jalan Sultan Ismail Southwest; Jalan Dewan Bahasa; Petaling Jaya; Shah Alam; Klang	Junctions; Tunnel intersections Under construction
		Changkat Thambi Dollah	East; Changkat Thambi Dollah; Tun Razak Exchange	
		Jalan Brunei	Northeast; Jalan Brunei	
		Pudu	Northeast; Jalan Pasar South; Jalan Sungai Besi; 3 4 Pudu LRT station	Junctions
		Pudu Roundabout	Kuala Lumpur Middle Ring Road 1 North; Jalan Tun Razak (Jalan Pekeliling); Kuala Lumpur city centre (KLCC) South; Sungai Besi Expressway Sungai Besi Expressway; Salak Selatan; Kuchai Lama; Sungai Besi; Mines Resort City; East–West Link Expressway AH2 Kuala Lumpur–Seremban Expressway; Petaling Jaya; Shah Alam; Klang; Kompleks Sukan Negara; Seremban; Melaka; Johor Bahru	Roundabout interchange
Jalan Pudu
		Jalan Chan Sow Lin Junctions	North; Jalan Tun Razak South; Jalan Chan Sow Lin	Junctions
Jalan Cheras
			Southeast; Jalan Cheras Lama; Maluri; Shamelin Perkasa; Bandar Tun Razak; FT 1 Cheras Highway; Cheras; Kajang; Seremban	
