= Rukun Negara =

Malaysian declaration of national philosophy

The Rukun Negara as displayed on a wall art at the Merdeka MRT station.

The National Principles (Malay: Rukun Negara; Jawi: روکون نݢارا) is the Malaysian declaration of national philosophy instituted by royal proclamation on Merdeka Day, 1970, in reaction to the 13 May race riots, which occurred in 1969. The riots proved at that time that Malaysian racial balance and stability was fragile. Immediately thereafter, the Malaysian government sought ways to foster unity among the various races in Malaysia. Therefore, the National Principles were formed.

The formulation of the National Principles were the efforts of the National Consultative Council or Majlis Perundingan Negara (MAPEN) as mandated by Majlis Gerakan Negara, chaired by then Deputy Prime Minister Tun Abdul Razak. The aim of the Rukun Negara is to create harmony and unity among the various races in Malaysia. Thereafter, the New Economic Policy (1971–1990) was launched in 1971, with the aim of creating unity among the various races in Malaysia, through economic equality, via the reduction of the economic gap among the Malays and Bumiputera, with that of the Chinese and Indian communities in Malaysia.

The principles bears similarity to the Pancasila national ideology/philosophy of neighbouring Indonesia.

== History ==
=== 13 May Incident ===
On the 13 May 1969, three days after the 3rd general election – in which opposition parties made gains at the expense of the ruling coalition – a racial riot occurred in the nation, mainly in Kuala Lumpur. According to the government's report, 196 people were killed during the riot, while Western diplomatic sources suggested a toll close to 600. The riot had led to the government declaring a state of national emergency in the country and imposing a nationwide curfew.

Following the declaration of emergency, the National Operations Council (NOC) or Majlis Gerakan Malaysia (MAGERAN) in Malay was formed and acted as the administrative body of the country for the following 18 months. With the aim of restoring law and order in the country, the NOC implemented various security measures nationwide, these included the suspension of newspaper publications, arrests of several individuals and the suspension of certain parts of the constitution.

=== Formation of National Consultative Council ===
The National Consultative Council, (NCC, Malay: Majlis Perundingan Negara) was formed in January 1970. The council consisted of the ministers of the NOC, representatives from state governments, political parties, press, trade unions, religious, social and professional groups in Malaysia. The council was tasked to discuss and propose solutions on issues regarding national unity, as well as formulating positive and practical guidelines that encourages national integration and racial unity to build a shared national identity amongst Malaysians. Discussions on the Rukun Negara was made on the council's second meeting, with its members providing suggestions to the draft prepared by the Department of National Unity and its Research Advisory Group.

A committee on Rukun Negara, chaired by Tun Tan Siew Sin, was formed at the same meeting. Other members of the committee includes Ghazali Shafie, Syed Hussein Alatas and Datuk Harun Idris. Aside from the initial 12 members, several individuals had also attended the council's meeting and contributed to the drafting of Rukun Negara, including former Lord President of the Malaysian Supreme Court, Salleh Abas, and historian Khoo Kay Kim. The first meeting of the committee was held at the Treasury Operations Room, Kuala Lumpur on March 31, 1970, while a second meeting was held on May 17.

At the first meeting, a concept known as "Pillars of the Nation" was proposed and was later incorporated into the Rukun Negara, the Pillars were:

- Ketuhanan (Belief in God or Supreme Being)
- Kesetiaan (Loyalty)
- Keadilan (Justice)
- Kewarganegaraan (Citizenship)
- Keutuhan (Integrity of the Nation)
- Kebahagiaan (Well-being)
- Kesopanan (Canons of Decency)

After discussing with its members, the committee submitted a document regarding the Rukun Negara draft to the NCC and NOC for its consideration and approval. The document suggested some changes on the initial draft, such as replacing "Menjujung Perlembagaan" with "Keluhuran Perlembagaan". It was reviewed and discussed by the NCC before it was finally passed by the NOC on 13 August 1970 after some modifications.

=== Declaration ===
The Rukun Negara was declared officially by the fourth Yang di-Pertuan Agong, Ismail Nasiruddin of Terengganu on August 31, 1970. The declaration was held on the 13th Independence Day celebration at Dataran Merdeka (formerly known as Selangor Club Padang). The celebration was themed "Muhibbah dan Perpaduan" (Goodwill and Unity) and the government changed the term "Independence Day" (Hari Merdeka) to "National Day" (Hari Kebangsaan) to promote national unity.

=== Promoting the Rukun Negara ===
On September 2, 1970, a meeting on the distribution of Rukun Negara was held in the Parliament Building. The meeting was presided by Dr. Agoes Salim, the Head of the Research Unit of the National Unity Department. It was decided by the attendees of the meeting that the Malay version of the text shall be the original, while the others as translations of the text. The recitation of the Rukun Negara was encouraged on official events and the text should be recited on the State Opening of the Parliament and State Legislative Assemblies. It was also proposed that a textbook on Rukun Negara should be provided to students, especially during the subject of Tatacara.

A brochure (buku risalah) was published and distributed by the Department of Information on the day of declaration of Rukun Negara. A pocket-sized version was also made for both the Malay and English version of the text. The Malay version was reprinted on 1983 following the new spelling system.

The Ministry of Information was responsible for distributing, promoting and explaining the Rukun Negara to the public. A three-day seminar was held to explain the content and meaning of Rukun Negara to all the ministry's officers. One of the writers of the declaration, Tan Sri Ghazali Shafie, also gave a talk on the annual general meeting of the department's Union of Employees regarding the Rukun Negara. Several promotional videos were also produced from time to time to be played on television, such as Towards National Unity by the National Film Department of Malaysia and the video for the Today in History programme (Hari Ini Dalam Sejarah) by the national archives.

== Rukun Negara text ==
=== New Version ===
The new version attempts to refine the language of the Rukun Negara including by using more inclusive terms and more concise wording and intends to preserve the original meaning and five principles will be preserved.

Original Malay texts	English translation
BAHAWASANYA, NEGARA KITA MALAYSIA mendukung cita-cita ke arah: Memperkukuh perpaduan masyarakat; Memelihara cara hidup demokratik; Membentuk masyarakat adil yang menikmati kemakmuran negara secara saksama; Menjamin kaedah liberal terhadap keterangkuman tradisi kebudayaan yang rencam; Membina masyarakat progresif dan berdaya cipta yang menggunakan sains dan teknologi terkini; MAKA KAMI, rakyat Malaysia, berikrar akan menumpukan seluruh tenaga dan usaha kami untuk mencapai cita-cita tersebut berdasarkan atas prinsip-prinsip yang berikut-: 1. KEPERCAYAAN KEPADA TUHAN; 2. KESETIAAN KEPADA RAJA DAN NEGARA; 3. KELUHURAN PERLEMBAGAAN; 4. KEDAULATAN UNDANG-UNDANG; 5. KESOPANAN DAN KESUSILAAN	WHEREAS OUR COUNTRY, MALAYSIA nurtures the ambitions towards: Strengthening the unity of society; Preserving a democratic way of life; Creating a fair society that enjoyed the prosperity of the country equitably; Ensuring a liberal method to the inclusiveness of diverse cultural traditions; Building a progressive and creative society that use of current science and modern technology; NOW THEREFORE, we, the people of Malaysia, pledge to concentrate our energy and to achieve these ambitions based on the following principles: 1. BELIEF IN GOD; 2. LOYALTY TO THE KING AND COUNTRY; 3. SUPREMACY OF THE CONSTITUTION; 4. SOVEREIGNTY OF THE LAW; 5. COURTESY AND MORALITY

=== Old Version (1970-2026) ===
Original Malay texts	English translation
BAHAWASANYA NEGARA KITA MALAYSIA mendukung cita-cita hendak: Mencapai perpaduan yang lebih erat dalam kalangan seluruh masyarakatnya; Memelihara cara hidup demokratik; Mencipta satu masyarakat yang adil di mana kemakmuran negara akan dapat dinikmati secara adil dan saksama; Menjamin satu cara liberal terhadap tradisi-tradisi kebudayaannya yang kaya dan pelbagai corak; Membina satu masyarakat progresif yang akan menggunakan sains dan teknologi moden; MAKA KAMI, rakyat Malaysia, berikrar akan menumpukan seluruh tenaga dan usaha kami untuk mencapai cita-cita tersebut berdasarkan atas prinsip-prinsip yang berikut: 1. KEPERCAYAAN KEPADA TUHAN; 2. KESETIAAN KEPADA RAJA DAN NEGARA; 3. KELUHURAN PERLEMBAGAAN; 4. KEDAULATAN UNDANG-UNDANG; 5. KESOPANAN DAN KESUSILAAN	WHEREAS OUR COUNTRY, MALAYSIA nurtures the ambitions of: Achieving a more perfect unity amongst the whole of her society; Preserving a democratic way of life; Creating a just society where the prosperity of the country can be enjoyed together in a fair and equitable manner; Guaranteeing a liberal approach towards our traditional heritage that is rich and diverse; Building a progressive society that will make use of science and modern technology; NOW THEREFORE, we, the people of Malaysia, pledge to concentrate our energy and efforts to achieve these ambitions based on the following principles: 1. BELIEF IN GOD; 2. LOYALTY TO THE KING AND COUNTRY; 3. SUPREMACY OF THE CONSTITUTION; 4. SOVEREIGNTY OF THE LAW; 5. COURTESY AND MORALITY

== Application ==
A wall at the Merdeka MRT station features the Rukun Negara as a textual art, symbolic of the precinct's significance in the foundation of the country.

The Rukun Negara has been a core part of Malaysian patriotic culture, and is embraced and celebrated through pledge recitations and in art.

=== Recitation ===
It is a norm for primary and secondary public schools in Malaysia to recite the pledge weekly during a compulsory assembly. Pledge reading follows immediately after the singing of the Malaysian national anthem, Negaraku. Of some interest, the Rukun Negara could usually be found behind the cover of every exercise book that is typically used by primary and secondary Malaysian public school students. This is primarily a move recognised to have been formulated to emulate the similar tactic introduced by the Singapore government immediately after its expulsion from the Malaysian federation in 1965.

On 8 December 2005, the Malaysian government has made reading of the pledge compulsory at official functions. The announcement was made a few months after the government made singing of the national anthem as compulsory at every official function.

== See also ==
- Malaysian New Economic Policy
- Singapore National Pledge
- Pancasila
