= Merdeka Precinct =

Merdeka
- Merdeka Precinct
- Presint Merdeka
- Merdeka Stadium and Merdeka 118 tower, the oldest and most recent landmarks of the precinct.

- Location within Kuala Lumpur Location within Malaysia
- Country: Malaysia
- Federal Territory: Kuala Lumpur
- Established: 1938 (as Coronation Park); 2016 (as Merdeka Precinct)

Area
  - Total: 16 ha (40 acres)
- Time zone: UTC+8 (MYT)
- Website: https://merdeka118.com/

Merdeka Precinct (Malay: Presint Merdeka; Jawi: ڤريسين مرديک), or Merdeka 118 Precinct is a 40-acre region in the old city centre of Kuala Lumpur, Malaysia, near Bukit Bintang and next to Kampung Attap. Among the projects involved in the development of the precinct includes the Merdeka 118 tower, 118 Mall, the Merdeka Textile Museum, Al-Sultan Abdullah Mosque and many more. It also contains previously established buildings such as the Merdeka Stadium, Stadium Negara and Wisma OCM.

== Name ==
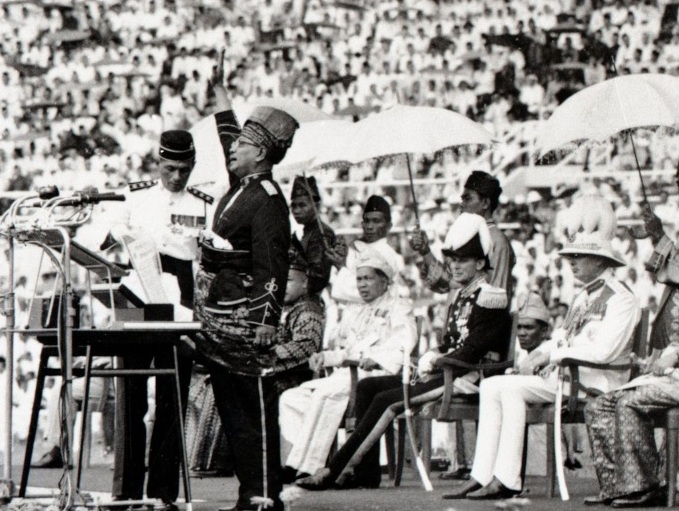
Tunku Abdul Rahman proclaimed "merdeka" seven times during the declaration of independence of Malaya from British intervention.

The word "merdeka" means "independent" in Malay, not only within the colonial context, but within the context of being able to survive on its own without external intervention. The region was named after the birth of the nation, when first its first Prime Minister Tunku Abdul Rahman declared the independence of the Federation of Malaya from British intervention by saying "merdeka!" seven times on 31 August 1957. The ceremony was conducted at the Merdeka Stadium which was built for and named after the event.

== History ==
Before the development of Kuala Lumpur City Centre (KLCC) In the late 1980s, the old Kuala Lumpur was centred around the confluence of the Gombak River and the Klang River, thus giving the name to the city "kuala lumpur" which literally means "confluence of mud", and the area is located south of the present-day city centre.

The Merdeka Precinct is located within this old city centre region.

=== Pre-Merdeka Day ===
The earliest recorded use of the area of the Merdeka Precinct was by the Cantonese Chinese community who moved to Kuala Lumpur around the 19th century, and built a cemetery in the area. Around 900 bodies were buried in the cemetery, which was found in 1938 when excavation works were being done for the construction of the Coronation Park, which would later be opened in 1940. The park was built as a gift to the people of Kuala Lumpur by British Resident in Selangor, S. W. Jones, in conjunction with the coronation of King George VI in 1936. The park would be equipped with recreational facilities suited for the youth and children such as a badminton court and a playground. It was initially planned for the park to also include seven football fields, a cricket field, 18 tennis courts, 18 badminton courts, seven basketball and netball courts, a bowling alley, a swimming pool and many more, however, the project was discontinued due to the Second World War.

In 1956, the administration has ordered for a stadium to be built in the old city centre in conjunction with the formation of Malaya in the following year. The area was picked to be used for such purpose under the suggestion of Tunku Abdul Rahman considering how it has been used for recreational and sports activities. The construction was handled by the Department of Works with architect Stanley Edward Jewkes as its design and construction planner. The stadium was built to be the venue for the ceremony of the declaration of independence of the Federation of Malaya on 31 August 1957, and was named the Stadium Merdeka ("Independence Stadium") to commemorate the event.

=== Early federation days ===
Tunku Abdul Rahman memeriksa taman permainan di Taman Merdeka bersama-sama Menteri Kerja Raya, Sardon Jubir dan Presiden Majlis Perbandaran Kuala Lumpur, G. S. Walker.

In 1958, the area surrounding the Merdeka Stadium was made into an open park named the Tunku Abdul Rahman Park, which would later be renamed to the Merdeka Park. The park, similar to its predecessor, would include recreational facilities for the youth and children, with a playground and sports facilities for football, hockey, tennis, and rubgy.

Initially, the area continued to grow as a recreational and sports district, with the opening of the National Stadium in 1962 as the country's first indoor stadium, and later the office complex for the Olympic Council of Malaysia (OCM) opened in 1991 by Sultan Azlan Shah.

=== Decline in the modernation era ===
During the 1980s, Kuala Lumpur underwent extensive modernisation works under the administration of Mahathir Mohamad. His plans have moved the centre point of the city north of its original area. As a result, many of its mega projects have moved the functions held by Kuala Lumpur to other regions, wuch as the administration to Putrajaya in 1999, and sports to Bukit Jalil in 1998.

Following the construction of the Bukit Jalil National Stadium, the area was neglected and facilities such as the Merdeka Park, Merdeka Stadium and the National Stadium were slowly abandoned due to the shift from the old city centre to the newly built KLCC.

The Merdeka Park was later shut down in 1998 to make way for further development, and both stadiums were considered for closure due to a lack of usage.

The area was further neglected following the 1997 Asian financial crisis which put more financial and operational burden on the government due to its persistence to proceed with major expenditures for its mega projects including the moving of the nation's sports centre and the hosting of the 1998 Commonwealth Games. This has also resulted in the development projects in the area being cancelled, thus saving the stadiums from demolition as a result.

=== Redevelopment ===
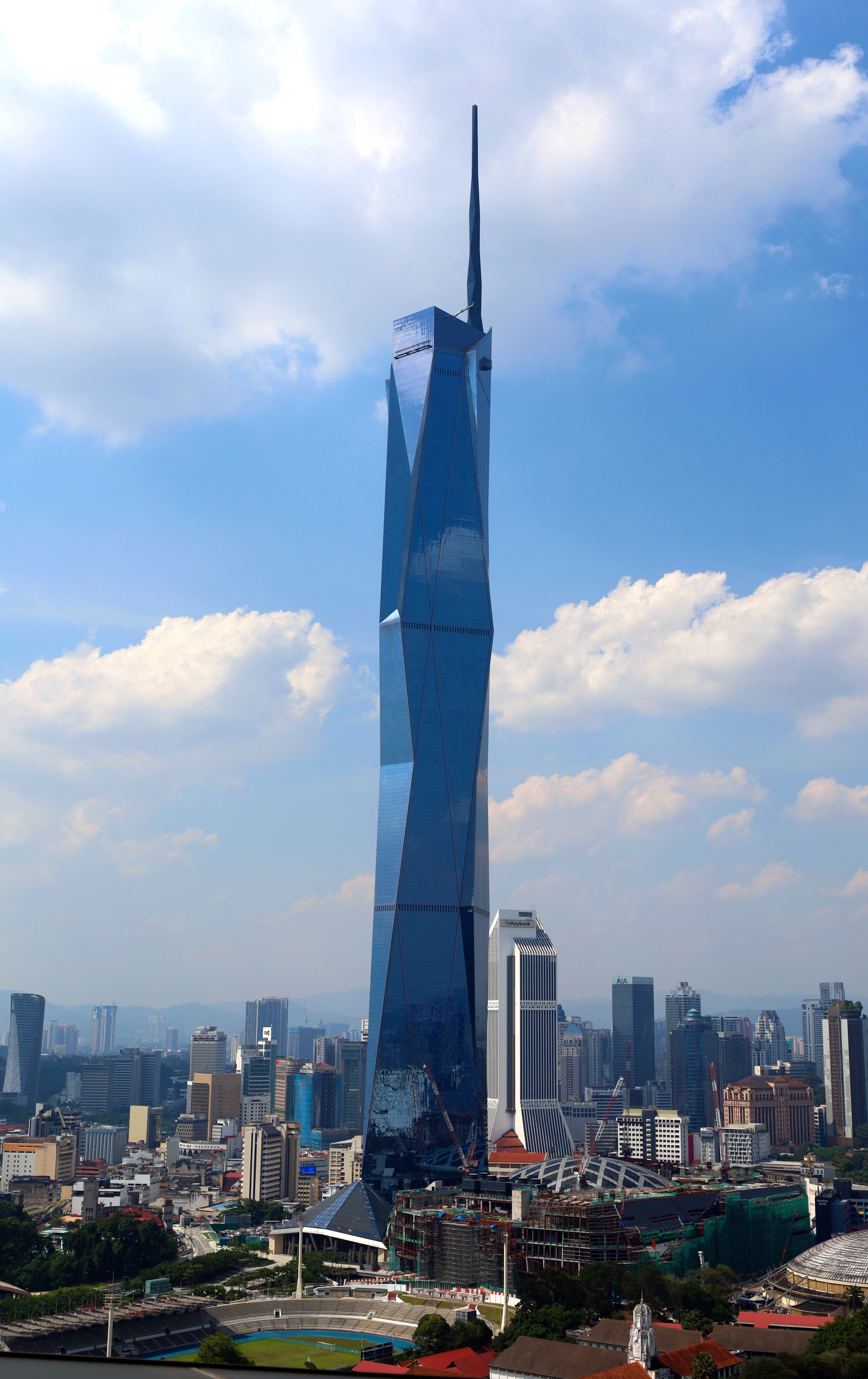
Warisan Merdeka tower was renamed to Merdeka 118, and becomes the precinct's main landmark.

In 2003, the government has given the responsibility to Permodalan Nasional Berhad (PNB) for the area's redevelopment, and works to repair both stadiums began in 2007. At the same time, Prime Minister Abdullah Ahmad Badawi also announced the construction of the Warisan Merdeka tower, marking the beginning of the precinct's development.

In 2014, the government announced the list of stations for the Kajang Mass Rail Transit line, where its 17th station was named Merdeka and located right at the Warisan Merdeka tower. The development of the tower was launched in 2016 by Prime Minister Najib Razak, and the tower was later renamed to KL118, then later PNB118, before being finalised as Merdeka 118.

In 2023, Merdeka 118 completed its construction and was officiated in 2024 by Al-Sultan Abdullah. Meanwhile, in the same year, OCM has requested to the Ministry of Youth and Sports for its headquarters to be moved to the KL Sports City in Bukit Jalil, near the headquarters of the National Sports Council and the new national stadium.

== Development ==
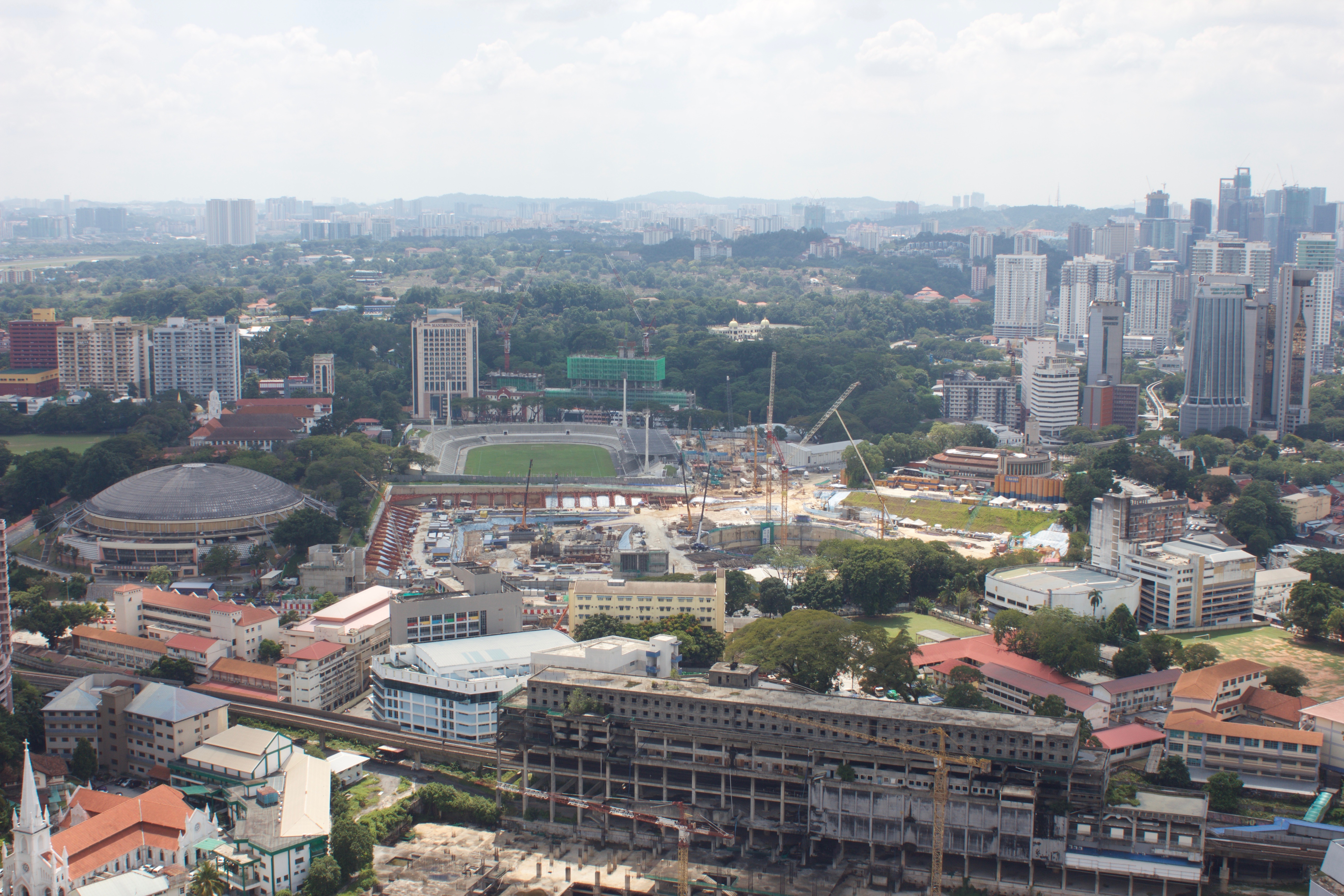
Early construction of Merdeka 118 in November 2016 marks the start of the development of Merdeka Precinct.

The Merdeka Precinct began its development with the construction of Merdeka 118 which was launched in 2016.

PNB Merdeka Ventures Sdn. Bhd. (PMVSB), a company fully owned by PNB, has been given the task to redevelop the area surrounding Merdeka Stadium to turn it into a modern commercial district that gives an ode to the historical heritage of the country.

Throughout its development, PMVSB has done various initiatives to ensure the surrounding communities are developed alongside the grand-scale project, considering how the old city centre has not reached such grand level of development as with the intended scale of the planned precinct, and could be badly affected by its surrounding expansion especially with regards to economy, society, arts, and culture.

Merdeka 118 completed its construction in November 2023, and was opened a few months later by the Yang di-Pertuan Agong, Al-Sultan Abdullah. Since then, the precinct was used for multiple events such as the Malaysia #QuranHour in 2026.

== Transport ==
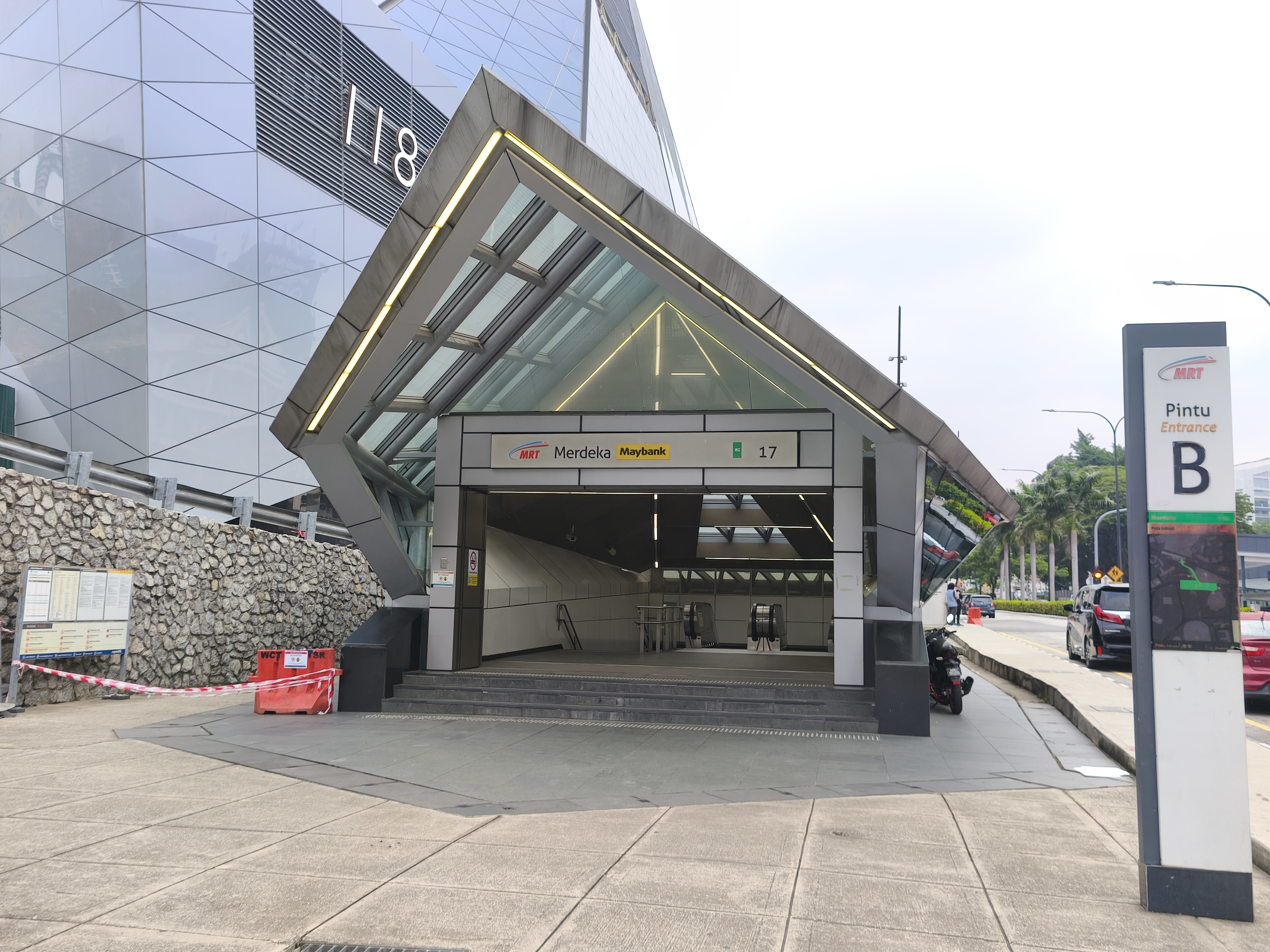
Merdeka MRT Station

=== Public transport ===
==== Railway ====
- RapidKL 9 Kajang MRT Line: Merdeka
- RapidKL 3 4 Ampang and Sri Petaling LRT Line: Plaza Rakyat
- RapidKL 8 KL Monorail: Maharajalela

== Gallery ==
118 Mall with Merdeka 118 tower in the backdrop

Merdeka Boulevard at 118

Merdeka Textile Museum

Wisma OCM

Stadium Merdeka

Stadium Negara
