= Plaza Rakyat =

Skyscraper in Kuala Lumpur, Malaysia

Coordinates: 3°08′41″N 101°42′10″E

People's Plaza
- Plaza Rakyat
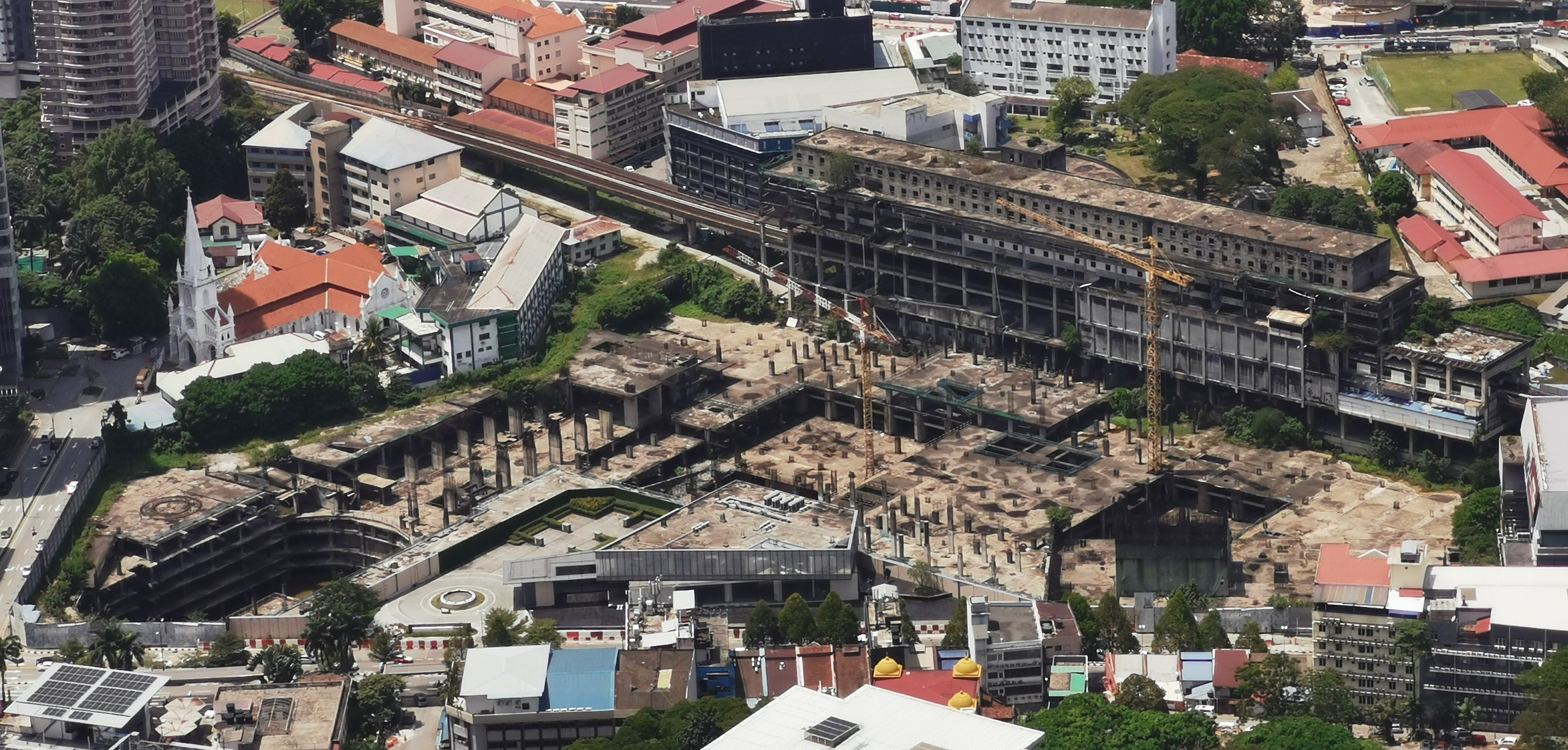
- The construction site of Plaza Rakyat (pictured in March 2023) has scraped since the project was stalled in 1997.
- Interactive map of the People's Plaza area

General information
- Status: On hold
- Type: Office, Hotel, Residential, Retail
- Location: Pudu Road, central Kuala Lumpur, Malaysia.
- Construction started: 1 January 1992
- Construction stopped: 1997
- Estimated completion: unknown
- Opening: unknown

Height
- Architectural: 387.5 m (1,271 ft); 295.3 m (969 ft); 261.4 m (858 ft); 173.6 m (570 ft)

Technical details
- Size: 24.35 acres
- Floor count: 92, 84, 70, 46 & 9 Floors of Retail podium

Design and construction
- Architect: Richard W Z Lee Architect (current)
- Developer: Profit Consortium Sdn Bhd (current)
- Main contractor: CRCG (M) Sdn Bhd (current)

Other information
- Public transit access: AG8 SP8 Plaza Rakyat LRT station

The People's Plaza (Malay: Plaza Rakyat) is an abandoned mixed-use skyscraper complex in Kuala Lumpur, Malaysia initiated during the 1990s. The project, which had already commenced construction, stalled due to the 1997 Asian financial crisis. Attempts to revive it have come and gone, but no progress has been made, and the construction site remains deserted as of 2025.

The development, originally designed by Skidmore, Owings and Merrill, was to comprise a 79-storey office tower, a 46-storey condominium, a 24-storey hotel and a 7-storey shopping centre. The original Puduraya bus depot was also intended to be replaced.

== History ==
Plaza Rakyat occupies a large triangular tract of land facing Pudu Road and Robertson Road, Kuala Lumpur, was previously a swampland before occupancy in 1929 by the Selangor Chinese Club, a social club consisting of a clubhouse mimicking the Selangor Club at Merdeka Square in layout and architectural style (in Mock Tudor architecture), and a vast field. The club was completely cleared away during the 1990s for the project.

The site remains connected (but closed) to the Ampang Line's Plaza Rakyat station, which was opened in 1996 in preparation for the completion of Plaza Rakyat.

== Abandonment and potential revivals ==
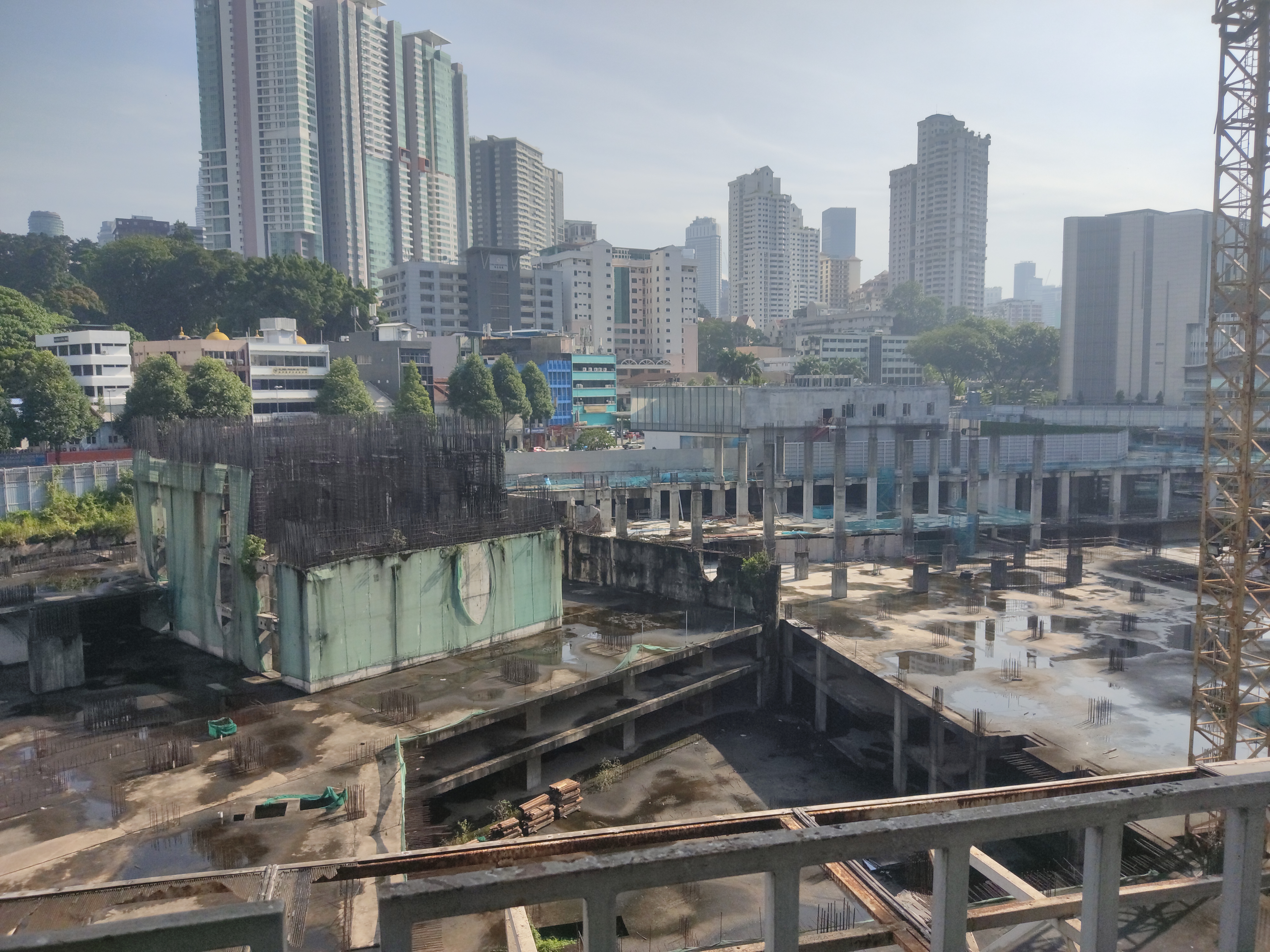
The construction site of Plaza Rakyat (pictured in November 2021).

The Plaza Rakyat development was put on hold in 1998 due to financial difficulties faced by the developer and the 1997 Asian financial crisis. Abandonments have similarly plagued several other building projects in Kuala Lumpur as a result of the 1997 financial crisis, such as the Duta Grand Hyatt at the intersection of Jalan Sultan Ismail and Jalan Ampang, and the Vision City, Kuala Lumpur at Jalan Sultan Ismail. As of December 2016, only the base of the Plaza Rakyat complex has been completed.

Efforts to revitalise the project, announced in 2005 and 2006, proved unsuccessful and the project continued to be stalled. On 26 October 2007, it was once again announced that the project would be revived after contract negotiations and amendments with the Government of Malaysia regarding the sale of the premises following the completion of the project. The project was then expected to be completed by 2012. However, little was said subsequently and the project continued to be abandoned.

After a public walkabout of the site by the newly installed Prime Minister Dato' Seri Najib Tun Razak in early 2009, the problem of the stalled construction project was looked at yet again. The government gave an ultimatum to the developer, Global Upline, three months from April 2009 to come up with a development plan or have its contract terminated. In July 2009, it was reported that the new contractor would be announced by the following month. However, in August 2009, Federal Territories Minister, Datuk Raja Nong Chik Raja Zainal Abidin said that the government had yet to accept any proposals from interested developers pending a response from Global Upline.

In December 2009, the government announced that it would terminate the deal with the current developer. The Federal Territories and Urban Wellbeing Ministry terminated the original contract with Plaza Rakyat Sendirian Berhad in 2010, 12 years after the company abandoned the mixed-development project. As of December 2012, according to Kuala Lumpur mayor Ahmad Phesal Talib, Kuala Lumpur City Hall was going through an arbitration process with the original contractor, with RHB Bank acting as the arbitrator.

Following completion of the arbitration process, Ahmad Phesal promised to appoint a new contractor for the site.

In November 2014, the city government of Kuala Lumpur (Kuala Lumpur City Hall) took possession of the site after completing the arbitration process. In doing so, the city government agreed to settle outstanding bank loans after negotiating over several months to reduce this amount.

In April 2016, the Deputy Minister of Federal Territories announced that work on the site would recommence in June 2017, twenty years after the site was abandoned.

In April 2017, Profit Consortium Sdn Bhd announced it planned four skyscrapers on the site, slated for completion in 2022. Profit Consortium bought the abandoned project from Kuala Lumpur City Hall (DBKL) for RM740 million in October 2015. The site remained abandoned until 2020 when the project is revived by another developer.

Minor demolition works on the abandoned site started back in 2020 to make way for Tower 2 which will consist a total of 70 floors, while Tower 3 will consist of 46 floors. A sales gallery for the new development has also been constructed along Jalan Pudu in 2021 but since then remains closed.

== Property Cost ==
Estimated costs for Plaza Rakyat 1996 - Retail Block MR 511.894.541 - Hotel Block MR 152.441.452 - Service Apartment Block MR 155.984.496 - Office Block MR 332.740.253 (it should be the world highest reinforced concrete skyscraper) Total: MR 1.153.060.742 SOM received for the complete preliminary design, incl. construction documents MR 88.000.000
