= UDA Holdings =

Government arm for urban development in Malaysia

UDA Holdings Berhad
- Formerly: Urban Development Authority of Malaysia
- Company type: Government-linked company (GLC)
- Founded: 12 November 1971; 54 years ago
- Headquarters: Blok Menara, Kompleks Pertama, Jalan Tuanku Abdul Rahman, 50100 Kuala Lumpur, Malaysia
- Key people: Tan Sri Dato' Seri Mohd Annuar Zaini (Chairman); Datuk Sr Mohd Salem Kailany (CEO)
- Parent: Minister of Finance Incorporated
- Website: www.udagroup.com.my www.udaproperty.com.my www.ancasahotels.com.my

UDA Holdings Berhad (formerly Urban Development Authority of Malaysia) is a Malaysian holding company. It served to launch and oversee urban development projects related to business, industry, and housing. It was also tasked with developing urban infrastructure. After 25 years of dedicated service, UDA was incorporated on June 20, 1995, becoming UDA Holdings Sdn Bhd, and later renamed UDA Holdings Berhad in 1999. It was subsequently listed on the Main Board of the Kuala Lumpur Stock Exchange. In 2007, UDA is delisted from the Main Board of Bursa Malaysia and becomes a wholly owned subsidiary of Khazanah Nasional. The following year, Khazanah transfers all UDA shares to the Ministry of Finance Inc.

== History ==
Urban Development Authority of Malaysia (UDA) was established on 12 November 1971 under the Ministry of Public Enterprise.

As a government agency, between 1971 and 1979, UDA had developed 118 commercial projects – 30 in the Federal Territory, 15 in Terengganu, 14 in Kelantan and 10 each in Perak and Kedah. These projects also include joint ventures with other government agencies such as MARA, Perkim, FOA and other cooperative societies, and also projects state development corporations particularly in less developed states. These projects have assisted bumiputras in business.

UDA was also responsible for the Kuala Lumpur comprehensive urban renewal programme in the 1970s and 1980s, which include the 16-storey Cahaya Suria, opened in late 1977, Puduraya and Dayabumi.

In 1996, it was incorporated and changed its full name to UDA Holdings Sendirian Berhad (UDA Holdings Private Limited). Later in 1999, it changed its status to a public limited company and changed its name to UDA Holdings Berhad. It was subsequently publicly listed on the Main Board of the Kuala Lumpur Stock Exchange (KLSE) on 18 November 1999, being the most active stock on that day.

== Real estate and property ==
=== Development ===
UDA develops and reappropriates urban structures as it sees fit. Although this is mainly confined to redeveloping "dilapidated buildings", UDA is also responsible for conservation of historic urban buildings. Several new towns have been developed by UDA, including the Bandar UDA Utama in Pulai; Bandar Pauh Jaya in Permatang Pauh; Tanjung Tokong in Penang; Bandar Baru UDA in Johor Bahru; Pusat Bandar Tampoi in Johor Bahru, Skudai Kanan in Johor Bahru; and Bandar Tun Hussein Onn in Cheras, Selangor. The development projects of UDA are implemented by its subsidiaries, PNS Development, UDA-Murni Development, UDAPEC, SBBU, and PERUDA Development.

A joint venture development between UDA, EPF and EcoWorld was announced in 2016 to develop the Bukit Bintang City Centre (BBCC), a fully integrated development located at the former site of Pudu Jail, with the project 40% owned by UDA, 40% owned by Eco World Development Group Berhad and 20% owned by EPF.

=== Maintenance ===
Properties belonging to or managed by UDA are maintained by its subsidiary companies. These properties include shopping complexes and apartment buildings. UBSB is the subsidiary that handles rental collection, carpark management, building maintenance, security, and other assorted services. City Guards is the subsidiary handling most of the security work, with 212 security personnel and 10 branches guarding 22 premises in the states of Selangor, Terengganu, Perak, Johor and Negri Sembilan, as well as the Federal Territory of Kuala Lumpur. Other subsidiaries dealing with maintenance are Daya Urus and Pertama Buildings Management.

=== Tourism and retailing ===
UDA has recently expanded into the hospitality industry, operating a hotel and three resorts in Kuala Lumpur, Port Dickson, Kuala Terengganu, and Seberang Prai. These lodgings are run by subsidiaries of UDA as well.

UDA has established a chain of retail outlets through a joint venture subsidiary, UDA Ocean. UDA has also ventured into franchising, and has a fashion line named "Bonia".

== Business performance ==
As of February 2006, the most recent full fiscal year for which statistics are available is 2004. In 2004, after-tax profit for UDA was RM17,665,000. Basic earnings per share was 5.61 sen, and shareholders' funds totaled RM1,159,454,000.
