= Merdeka MRT station =

MRT station in Kuala Lumpur, Malaysia

KG17 Merdeka – Maybank
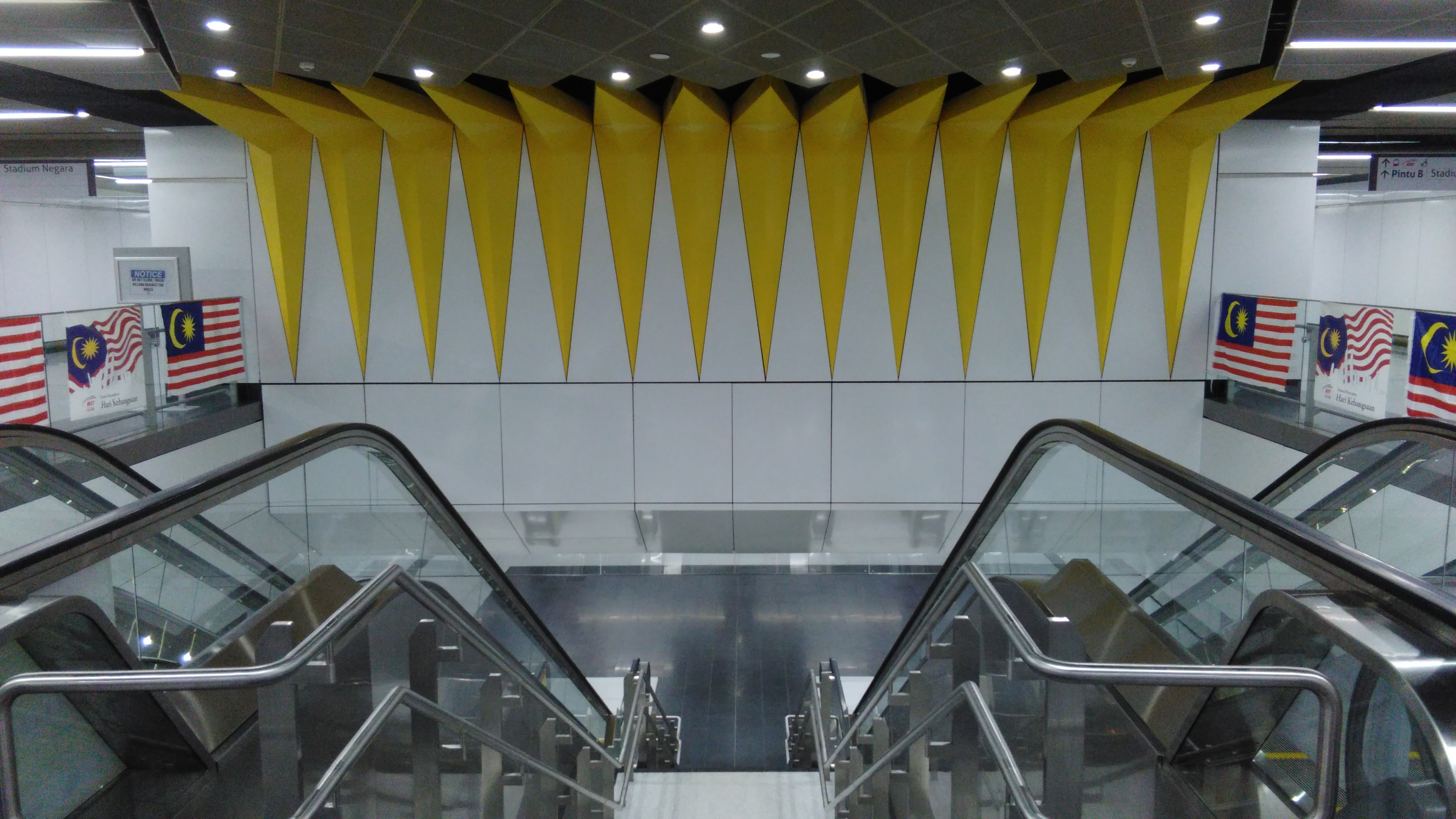
- The interior design of the station incorporates the theme of "independence" as shown by this decoration that is inspired by the 14-pointed star of the Malaysian flag.

General information
- Other names: Malay: مرديک (Jawi); Chinese: 默迪卡; Tamil: மெர்டேக்கா
- Location: Jalan Hang Jebat, City Centre, 50150 Kuala Lumpur; Malaysia
- Coordinates: 3°8′31.09″N 101°42′7.38″E
- System: Rapid KL
- Owner: MRT Corp
- Operator: Rapid Rail
- Line: 9 Kajang Line
- Platforms: 1 island platform
- Tracks: 2
- Connections: Integrated station with AG8 SP8 Plaza Rakyat via a 180-metre paid-to-paid pedestrian walkway

Construction
- Structure type: Underground
- Depth: 30.4 metres (100 ft)
- Platform levels: 1
- Parking: Not available
- Cycle facilities: Not available
- Accessible: Yes

Other information
- Station code: KG17

History
- Opened: 17 July 2017; 9 years ago

Services
Preceding station		Following station
Pasar Seni towards Kwasa Damansara	Kajang Line	Bukit Bintang towards Kajang
Location

The Merdeka MRT station, also known as Merdeka-Maybank MRT station under the station naming rights programme, is a mass rapid transit (MRT) underground station in Kuala Lumpur, Malaysia. It is one of the stations of the MRT Kajang Line (formerly known as MRT Sungai Buloh–Kajang Line) and serves as an interchange station with Plaza Rakyat LRT station for the LRT Ampang and Sri Petaling Lines. The station was opened on 17 July 2017 under Phase Two operations of the MRT line.

The station's name translates to "independence" in English and is taken from its location near the historic Stadium Merdeka (English: Independence Stadium), where the independence of the Federation of Malaya was declared on 31 August 1957, and the covered Stadium Negara (English: National Stadium). The station is located beneath Jalan Hang Jebat (formerly Jalan Davidson), adjacent to historical landmarks such as Stadium Negara, Stadium Merdeka, Merdeka Maybank Tower and the 118 Mall.

== Nearby stations ==
The station is connected and integrated with the Plaza Rakyat LRT station via a 180-metre pedestrian linkway. The linkway connects the paid areas of both stations, thus allowing commuters to transfer between the MRT Kajang Line and the LRT Ampang and Sri Petaling Lines without exiting the paid area of both stations and purchasing a new ticket.

The station is located about 600 metres away and is within walking distance of the Hang Tuah LRT and Monorail station.

== Station design ==
=== Station features ===
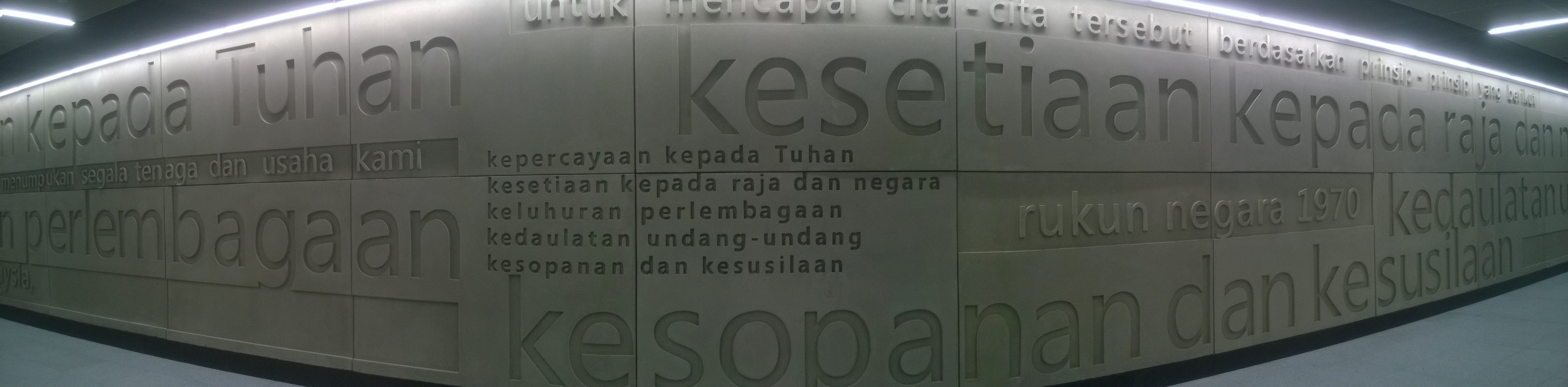
The decorative relief wall portraying the Rukun Negara at the Upper Concourse Level of the station.

As the underground station is near the historic Stadium Merdeka where Malaysia's first Prime Minister Tunku Abdul Rahman declared the independence of the Federation of Malaya from the British Empire on 31 August 1957, the theme "independence" was chosen for the interior design for this station.

The theme is manifested through several features such as a wall at the Upper Concourse Level bearing a relief of the Rukun Negara, the Malaysian national pledge. The ceiling above the escalator leading down from the Upper Concourse Level to the Lower Concourse Level bears a motif of the arms of the 14-pointed star on the flag of Malaysia, also known as the Federal Star.

At the Lower Concourse Level, each pillar bears the flag and emblem of each state of Malaysia.

=== Station layout ===
G
Street Level
Entrance A and Entrance B along Jalan Hang Jebat, Taxi and E-hailing Layby, Kiss and ride lay-by, escalators, lifts and staircases to Upper and Lower Concourse levels
B1
MRT Upper Concourse
The Merdeka and Rukun Negara feature walls

Connection to the 118 Mall

B2
MRT Lower Concourse
MRT Station Control, MRT Customer Service Office, Ticketing Machines and Fare gates. Entrance C paid-to-paid walkway to the concourse level of Plaza Rakyat LRT station
B4
MRT Platform Level
Platform 1: 9 Kajang Line towards KG35 Kajang (→)
Island platform, doors will open on the right
Platform 2: 9 Kajang Line towards KG04 Kwasa Damansara (←)

=== Exit and entrances ===
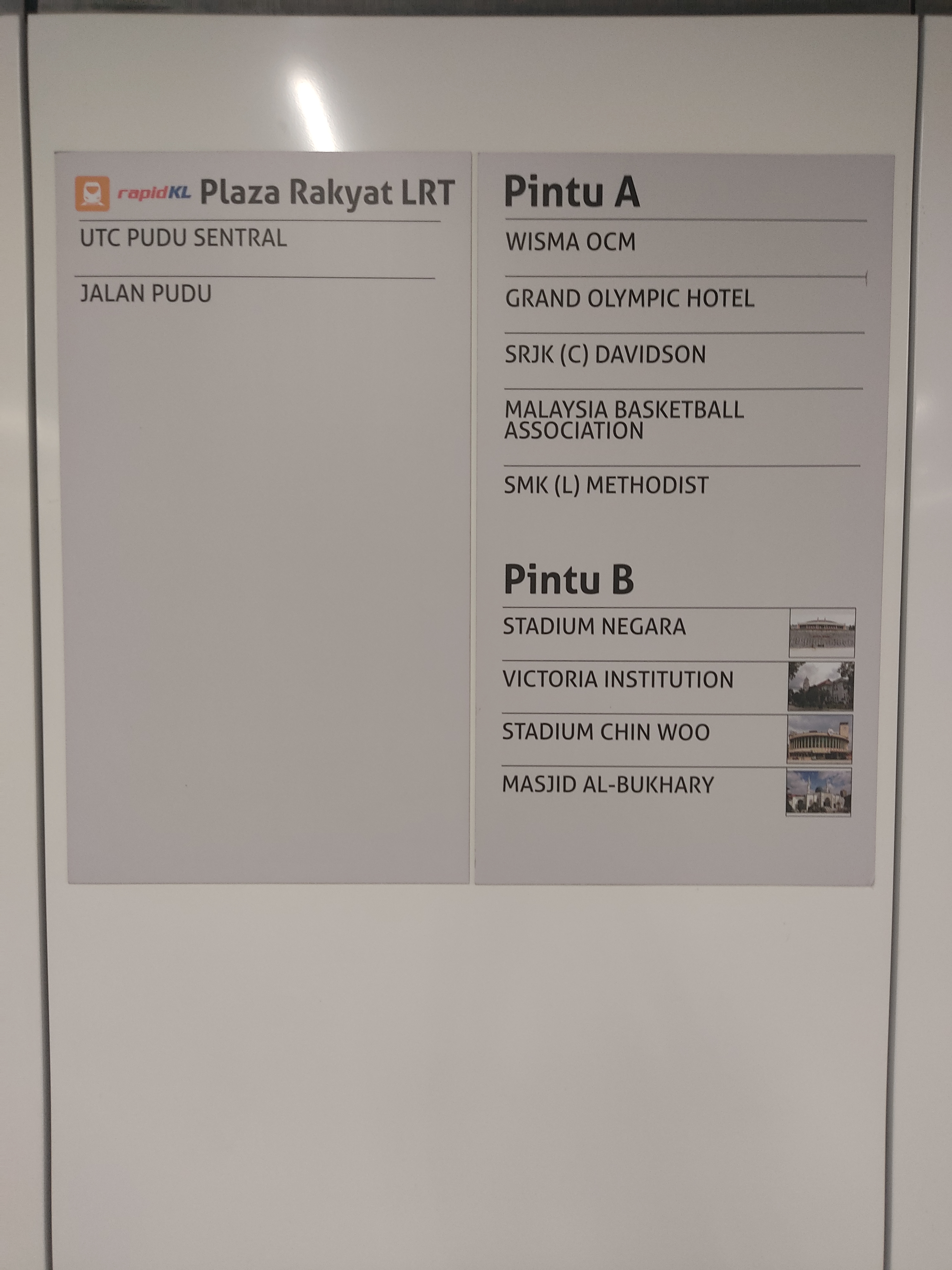
Destinations of the station

The station can be accessed via two main entrances (Entrance A and Entrance B) located along Jalan Hang Jebat, as well as the paid-to-paid walkway from the Plaza Rakyat LRT station via Entrance C. Entrance A is located on the north side of Jalan Hang Jebat near the YWCA and Olympic Hotel while Entrance B is located on the south side near Stadium Negara and the Merdeka Maybank Tower. The station is located about 600 meters away and is also within walking distance of the Hang Tuah LRT and Monorail station, connected with the Bukit Bintang City Centre (BBCC) development.

Kajang Line station
Entrance	Location	Destination	Picture
A	North side of Jalan Hang Jebat	Shoplots, Grand Olympic Hotel, YWCA KL (Young Women's Christian Association of Kuala Lumpur), Wisma OCM and SJK (C) Jalan Davidson	
B	South side of Jalan Hang Jebat	Stadium Negara, Merdeka Maybank Tower, Victoria Institution	
C LRT-MRT Linkway	Underground at Lower Concourse level with escalator and travelator to elevated linkway	LRT MRT	
D	Upper Concourse Level	Mall	

== Around the station ==
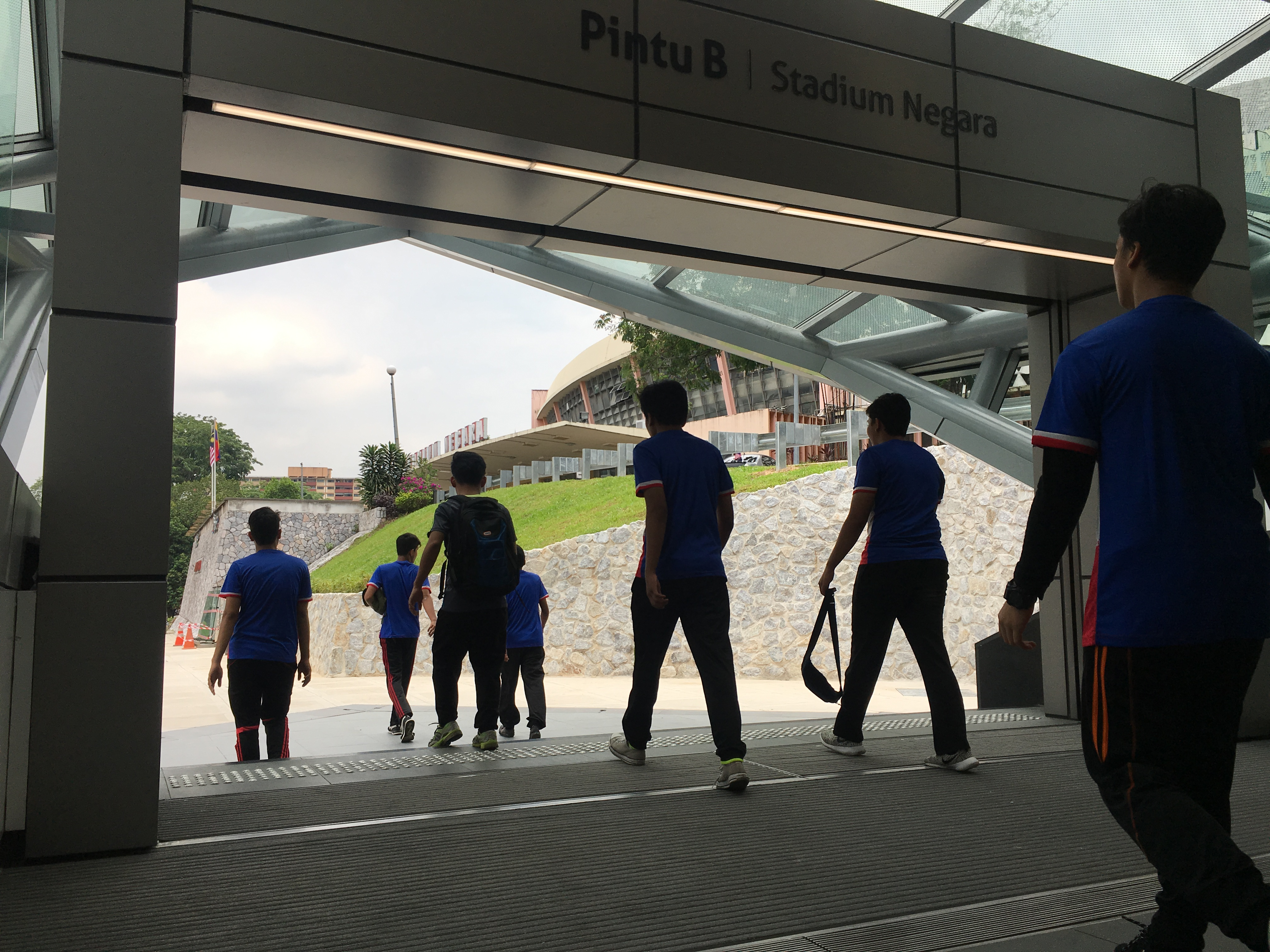
Entrance B of the station with the Stadium Negara in the background

The station is located near Stadium Merdeka, currently being refurbished as part of the Merdeka 118 project. Directly next to Entrance B of the station is the Stadium Negara indoor stadium.

The 118-storey Merdeka Maybank Tower (formerly known as Merdeka 118), which was completed in 2023, is currently the tallest building in Malaysia and in the Southeast Asia region, as well as the second tallest building in the world.

The Bukit Bintang City Centre (BBCC) and LaLaport shopping mall is also located nearby the station and is within walking distance through a linkage covered walkway.

== Bus services ==
Being in the city centre, MRT feeder buses do not operate from this station. However, it is adjacent to Pudu Sentral, a city bus terminal in Kuala Lumpur.

== Gallery ==
=== Station ===
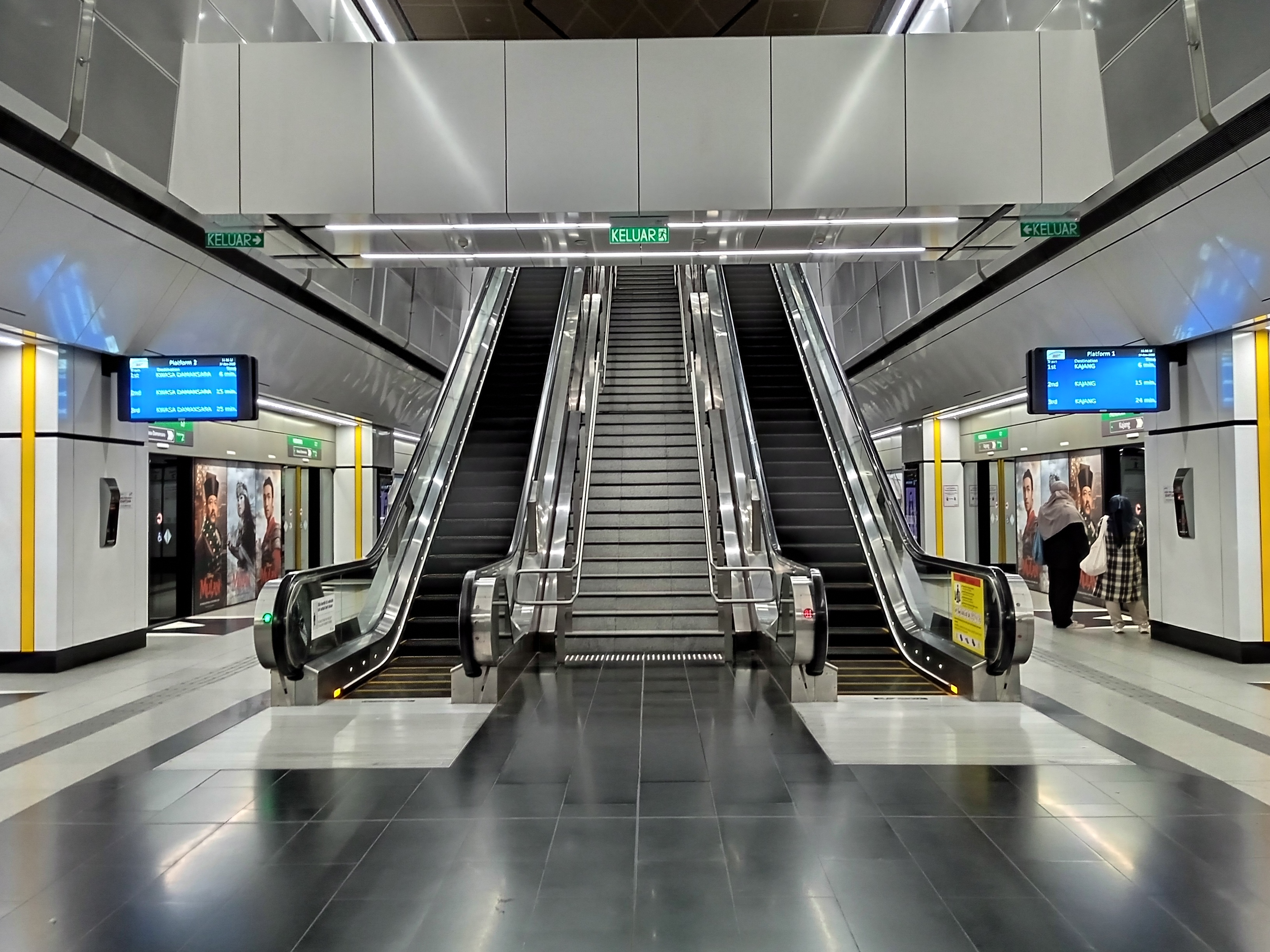
Platforms of the MRT station

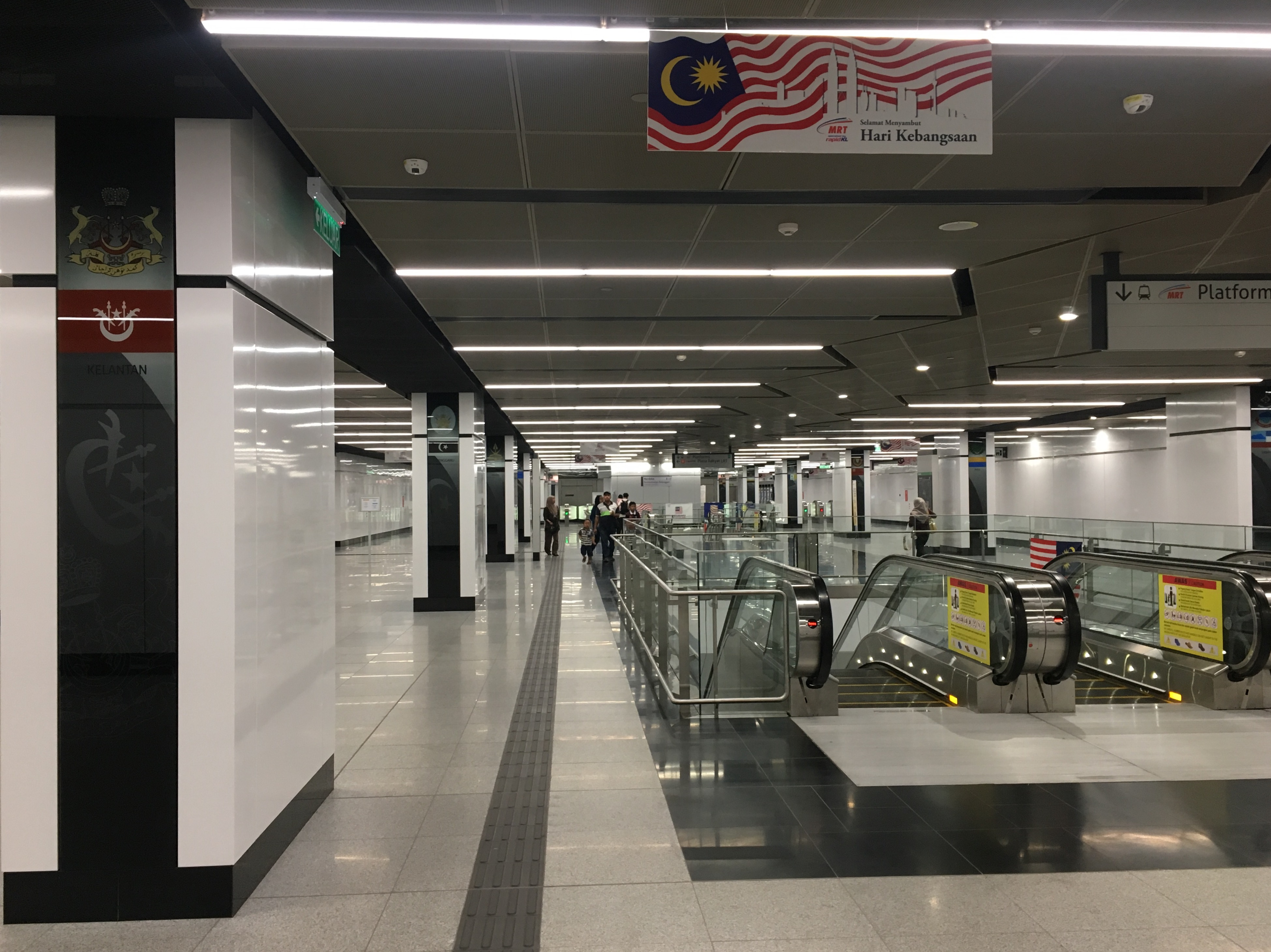
Flags and emblems of Malaysian states on the pillars at the Lower Concourse Level of the station

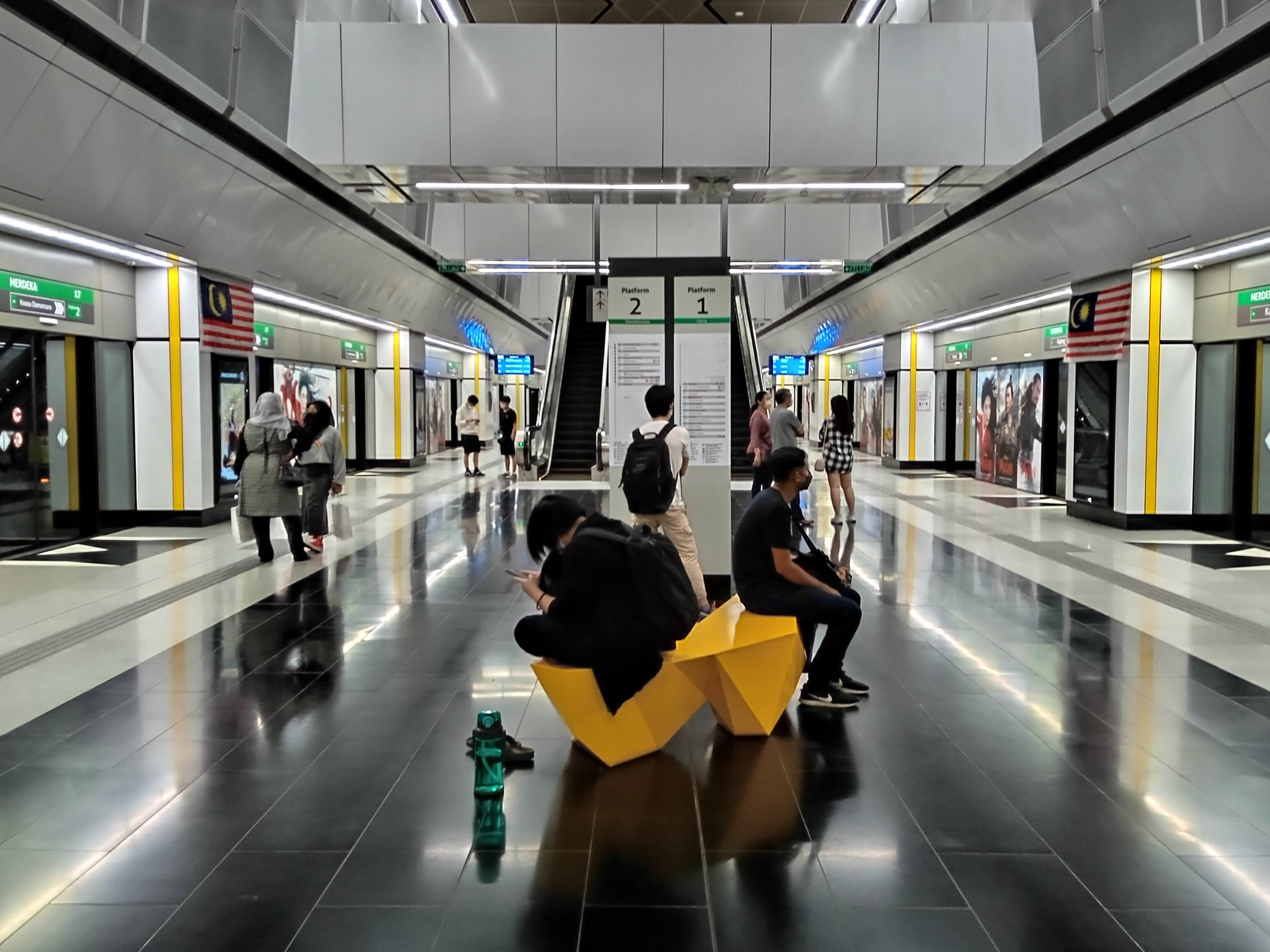
Bench at the Platform Level of the station, which was designed by student Chong Chin Sheng as part of a bench design competition

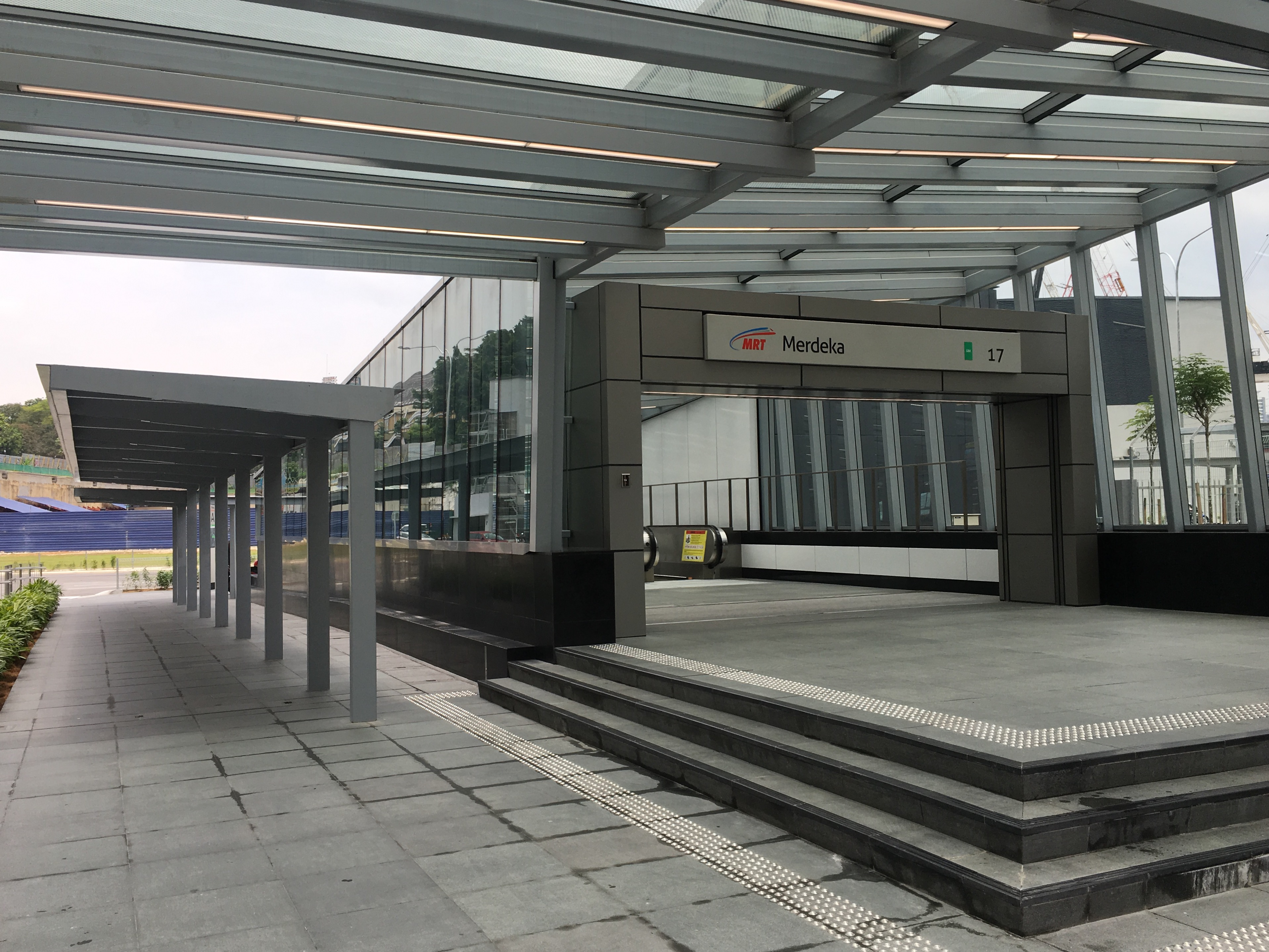
Entrance A of the station

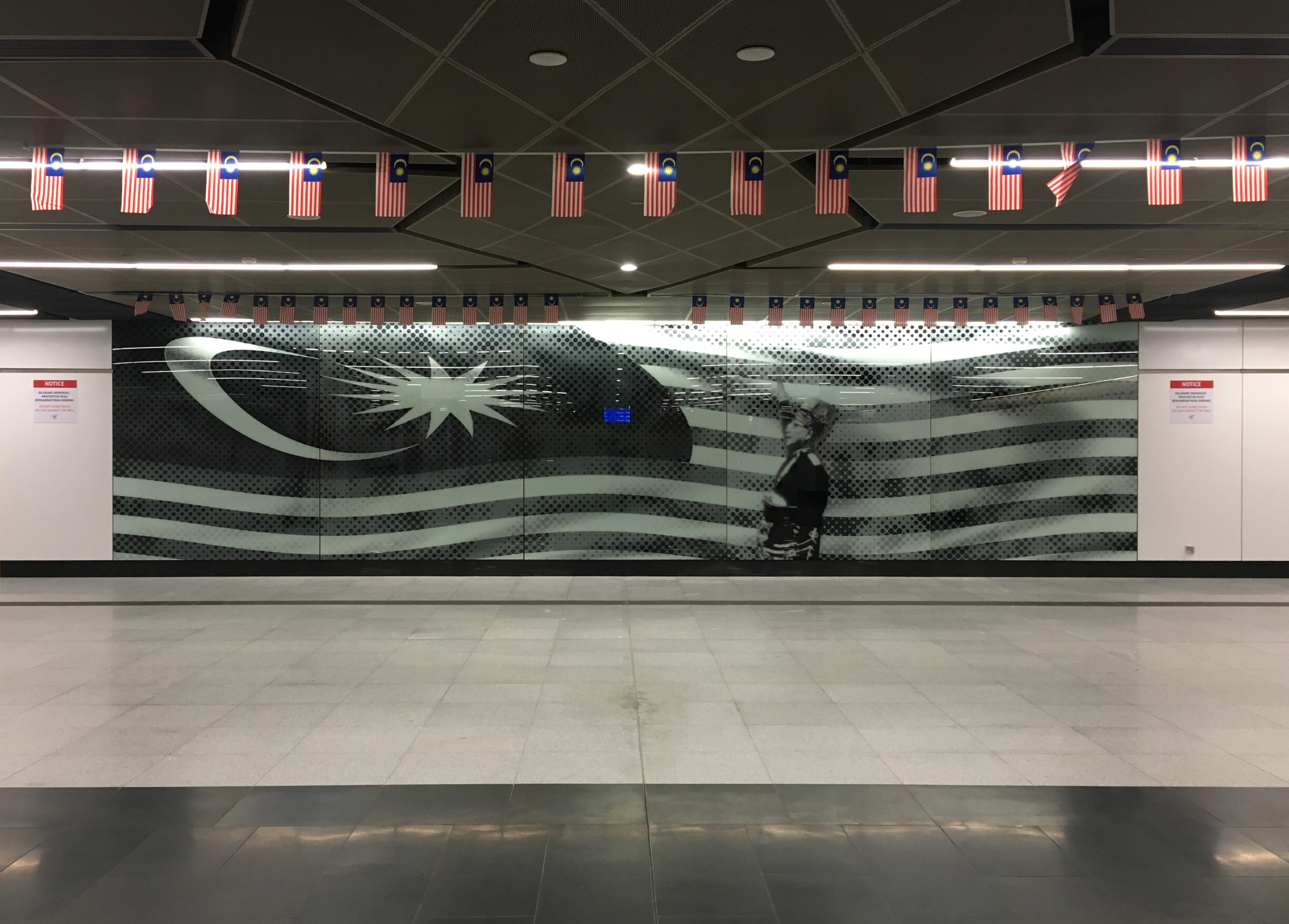
The Declaration of Independence feature wall at the Upper Concourse Level of the station

=== Linkway to Plaza Rakyat LRT station ===
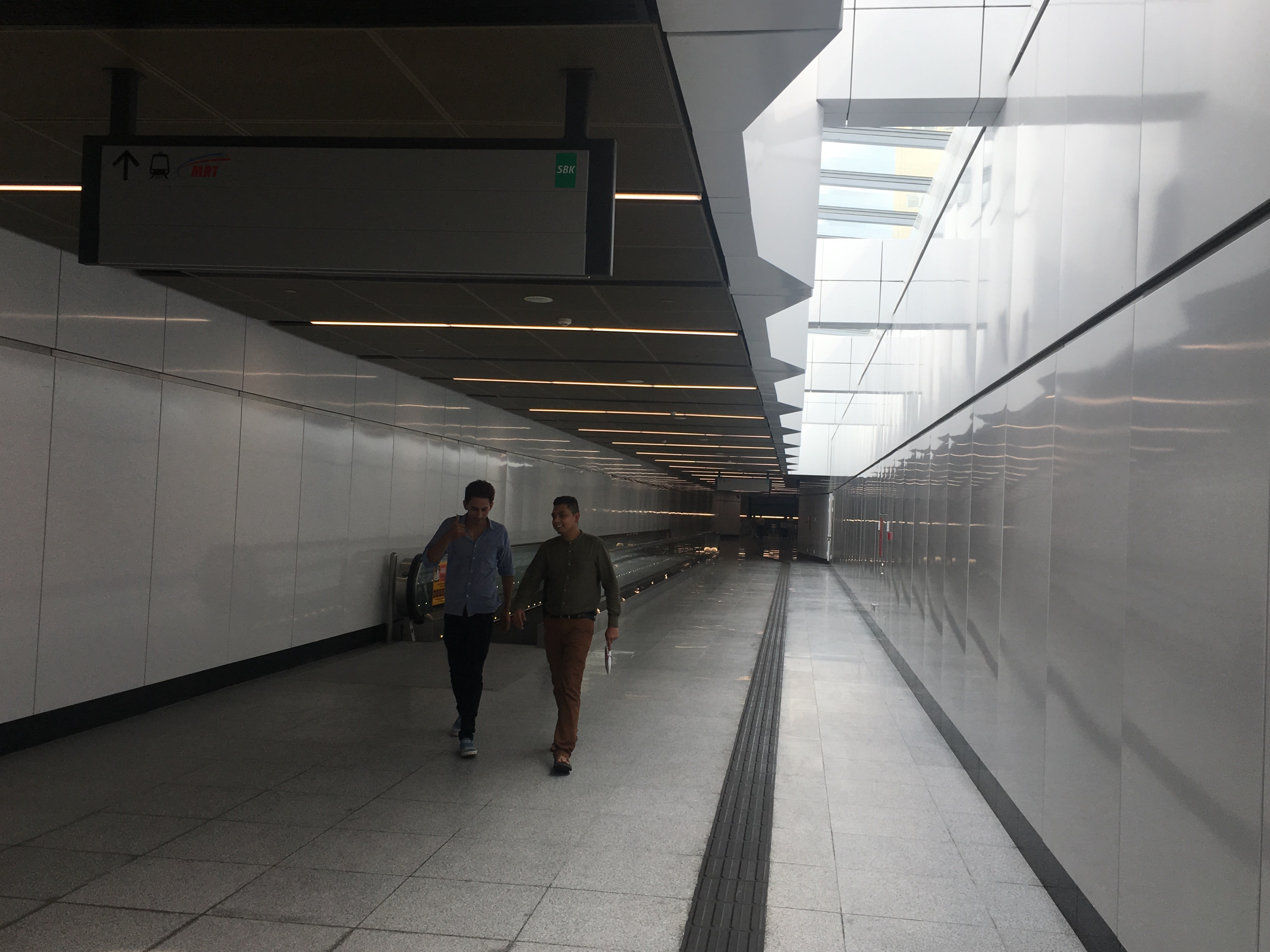
View of the linkway heading towards the MRT station

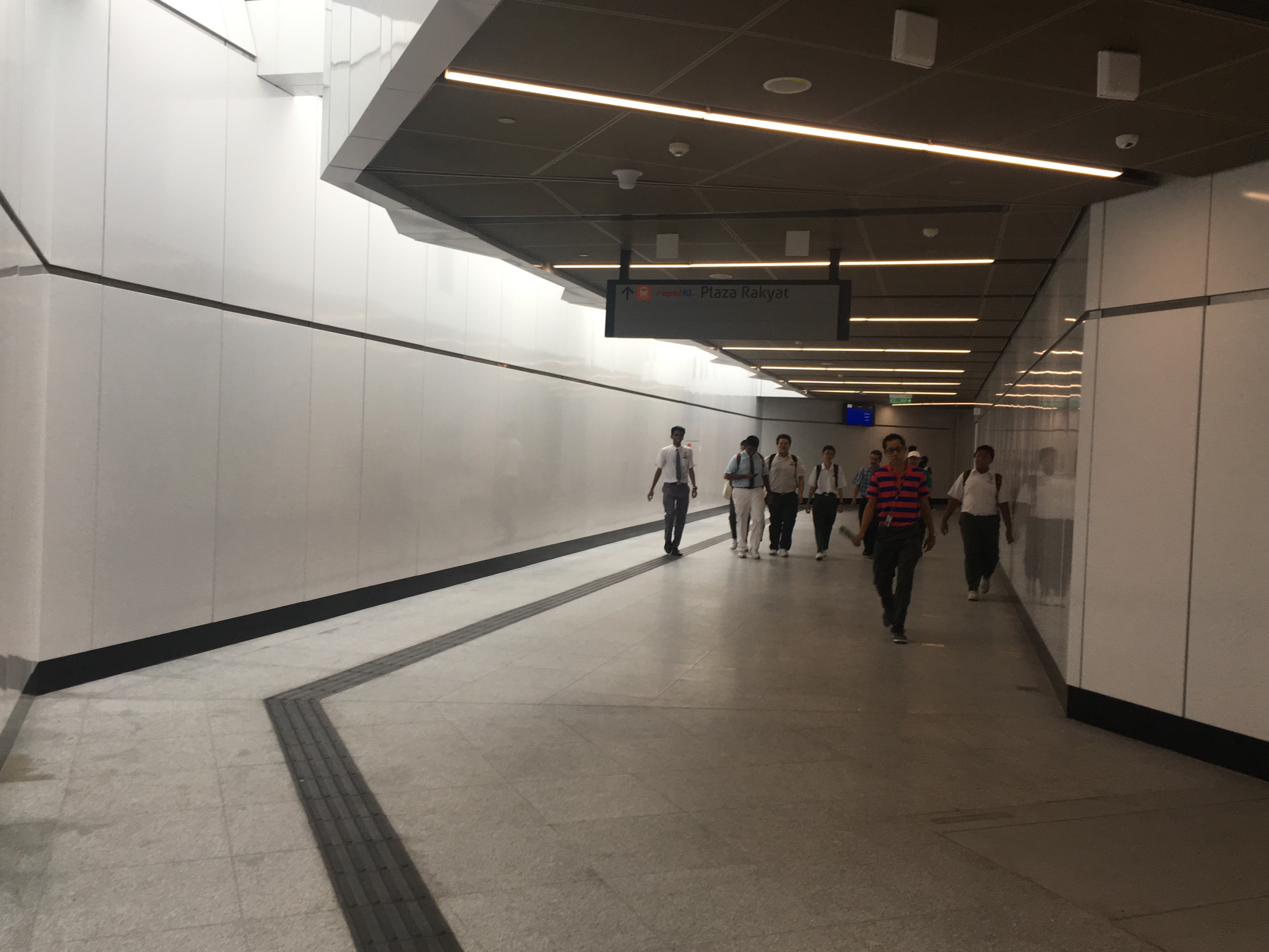
View of the linkway heading towards the LRT station

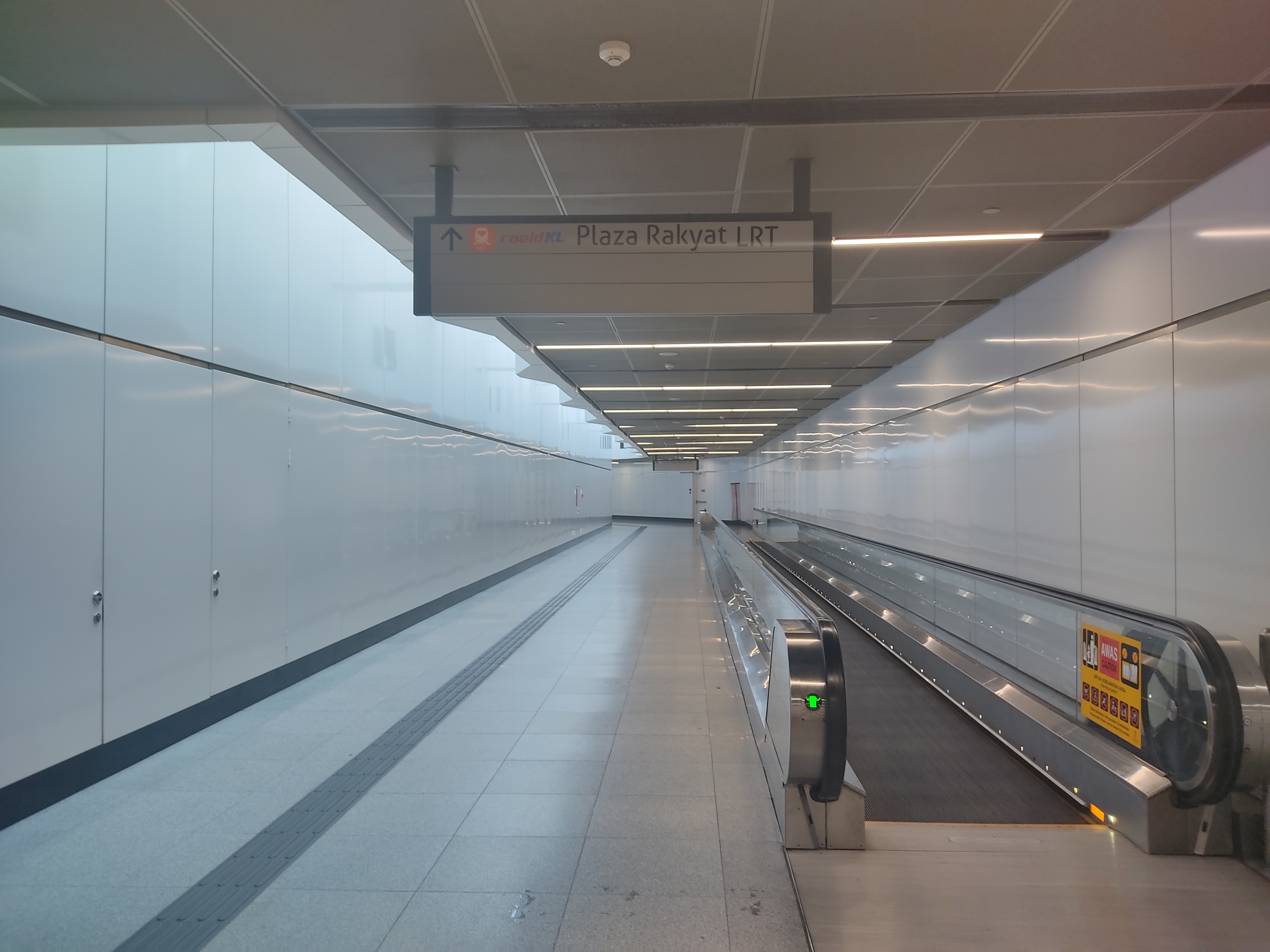
Travelator at the linkway towards the LRT station
