= Pudu Sentral =

Bus station in Kuala Lumpur, Malaysia

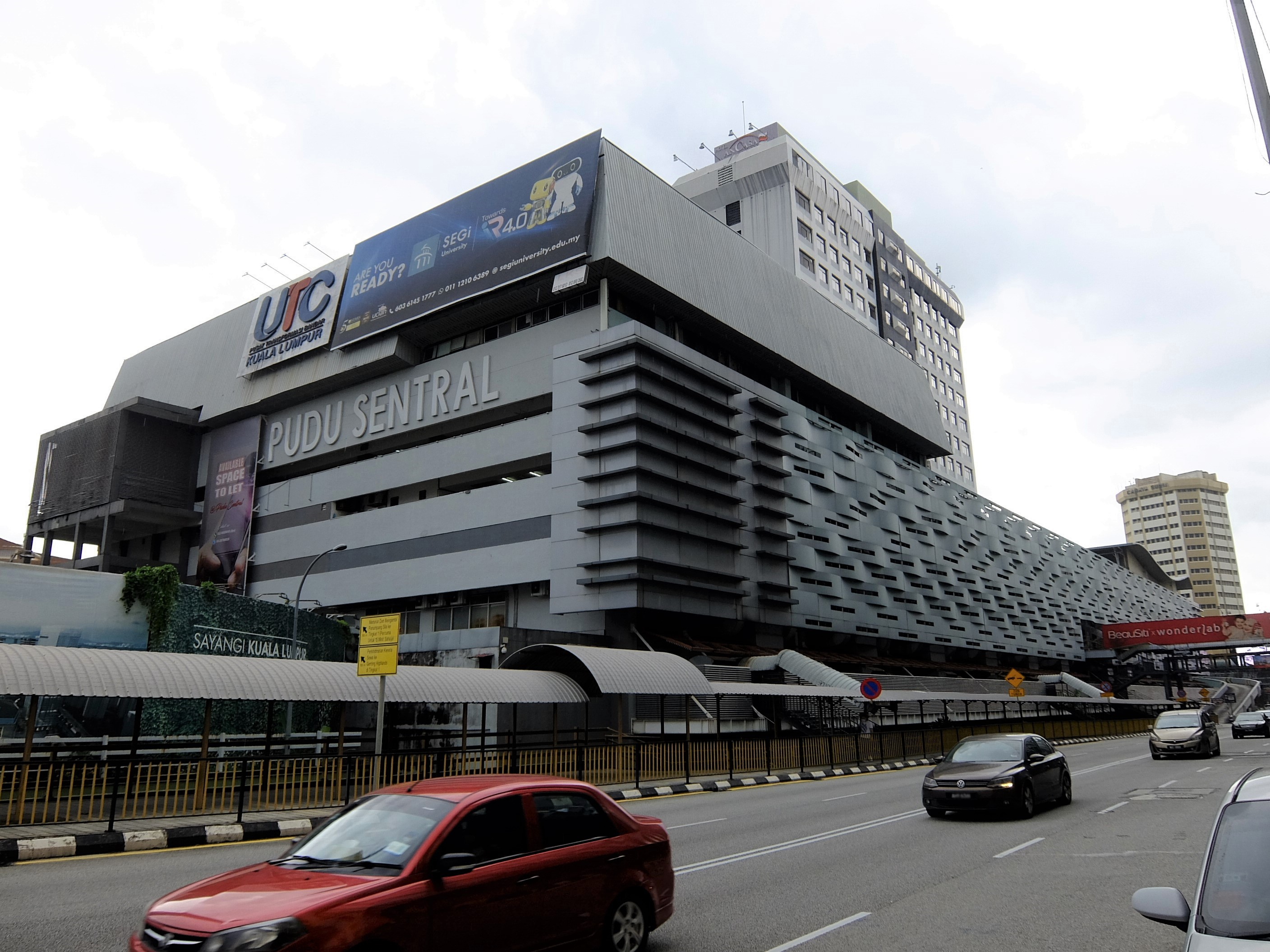

General information
- Location: Jalan Pudu, Kuala Lumpur, Malaysia
- Coordinates: 3°08′44″N 101°42′03″E
- Owner: UDA Holdings
- Operator: Causeway Link; Johora; Maju; Star Shuttle; Various others
- Platforms: 23

Construction
- Structure type: Basement bus terminal

Other information
- Website: UDA Mall

History
- Opened: 2 October 1976
Location

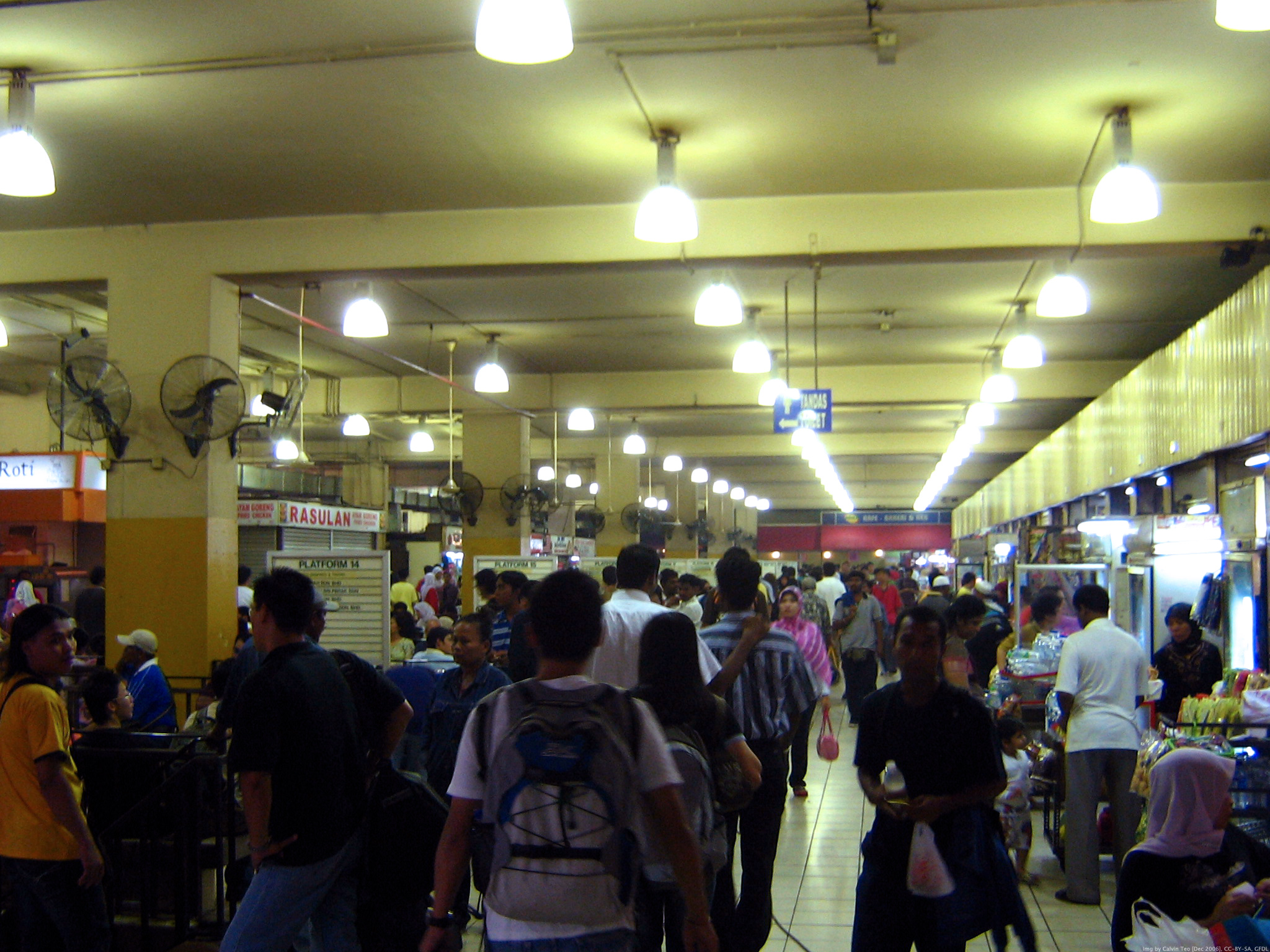
An interior of Puduraya.

The Pudu Sentral (formerly Puduraya Terminal (Malay: Hentian Puduraya)) is the main local service bus terminus in Kuala Lumpur, Malaysia. It was opened on 2 October 1976.

Long-distance buses no longer arrive and leave from Pudu Sentral with these instead moved to Terminal Bersepadu Selatan near Bandar Tasik Selatan station. Pudu Sentral thus lost half of the bus volume to the Bandar Tasik Selatan Integrated Transport Terminal.

== History ==
Originally known as Puduraya, it was officially opened on 2 October 1976. The terminal was developed by the Urban Development Authority as part of the Kuala Lumpur comprehensive urban renewal programme at a cost of RM 16 million. The podium block opened in 1977 while the 14-storey tower block opened in April 1978.

North-bound buses moved to Hentian Duta in April 2003.

In 2006, Pudu Sentral underwent a renovation costing about RM3 million (approx. US$817,000)

Department Minister Nazri Aziz said in May 2009 that with the opening of Terminal Bersepadu Selatan, Puduraya would only cater to city buses and taxis. Traffic congestion near Puduraya bus terminus was reduced after Terminal Bersepadu Selatan (TBS) opened on 1 January 2011. TBS caters for most of Kuala Lumpur's long distance buses that previously utilised Pudu Sentral.

Second Finance Minister Datuk Seri Ahmad Husni Hanadzlah also said in May 2009 that Puduraya would undergo a facelift to upgrade services as it prepared to become a city terminal. They included a new coat of paint, upgrading pedestrian walks from Plaza Rakyat LRT station to Puduraya, upgrading lifts and toilets and installing new fire prevention equipment.

Puduraya was reopened on 16 April 2011 after undergoing massive renovations costing RM52.7mil. The terminal was closed in April 2010 for upgrading works and was supposed to be re-opened in September 2009.

On 27 August 2011, the Puduraya bus terminal was renamed as Pudu Sentral in keeping with its modern and new look on par with an airport. Prime Minister Datuk Seri Najib Razak said the new name was a suggestion from a follower on his Twitter account.

On 23 September 2012, Pudu Sentral became the Urban Transformation Centre for Kuala Lumpur. It was launched by Najib Razak. Pudu Sentral became the second Urban Transformation Centre after Malacca in June 2012. The Urban Transformation Centre houses government agencies, scores of private businesses, a Kedai Rakyat 1Malaysia branch and a Kedai Kain 1Malaysia branch. The first Kedai Buku 1Malaysia is also located here. The transformation to become Urban Transformation centre cost RM24 million and took 6 weeks to complete. It was funded by the Ministry of Finance.

Najib said the Urban Transformation Centre would still run buses from its location. UDA Holdings chairman Datuk Nur Jazlan Mohamed said the transformation meant that there would be more buses at the terminal, especially with its additional facilities.

== Incidents ==
=== Explosion ===
On 15 June 2007, a small homemade explosive, concealed in a snack wrapper and left on a concrete bench, was detonated at 9.10 pm (MST) at the Platform 7 entrance of the Puduraya bus station concourse, wounding an 11-year-old girl. The police, who vowed to investigate the motive of the blast and find the culprits of the bombing, ruled out the possibility that the bombing was masterminded and executed by militants, as certain quarters had claimed. No news pertaining to the bombings was available to the public thereafter.

== Management ==
The current operator of this bus terminal is UDA Holdings.

== Transportation ==
The bus terminal is accessible from Plaza Rakyat LRT Station and the Merdeka MRT station.
