= Plaza Rakyat LRT station =

Metro station in Kuala Lumpur, Malaysia

AG8 SP8 Plaza Rakyat
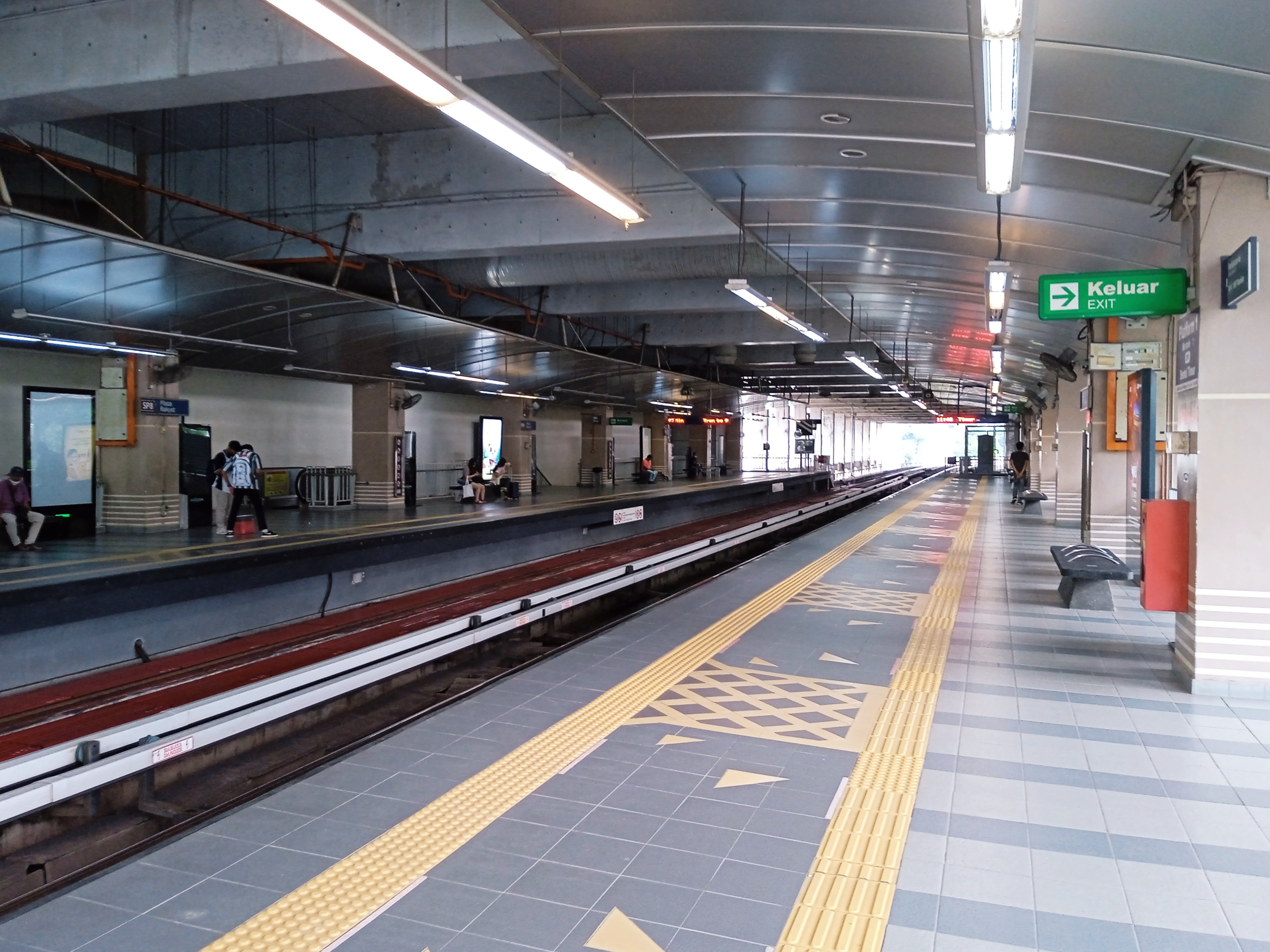

General information
- Other names: Malay: ڤلازا رعيت (Jawi); Chinese: 人民广场; Tamil: பிளாசா ராக்யாட்
- Location: Jalan Pudu; 56000 Kuala Lumpur; Malaysia
- Coordinates: 3°8′40″N 101°42′5″E
- System: Rapid KL
- Owner: Prasarana Malaysia
- Operator: Rapid Rail
- Lines: 3 Ampang Line; 4 Sri Petaling Line
- Platforms: 2 side platforms
- Tracks: 2
- Connections: Integrated station with KG17 Merdeka via a 180 metres paid-to-paid pedestrian walkway

Construction
- Structure type: Elevated
- Platform levels: 2
- Parking: Not available
- Cycle facilities: Not available
- Accessible: Available

Other information
- Station code: AG8 SP8

History
- Opened: 16 December 1996; 29 years ago

Services
Preceding station		Following station
Masjid Jamek towards Sentul Timur	Ampang Line	Hang Tuah towards Ampang
Masjid Jamek towards Sentul Timur	Sri Petaling Line	Hang Tuah towards Putra Heights
Location

Plaza Rakyat LRT station is an elevated light rapid transit (LRT) station in central Kuala Lumpur, Malaysia. The station is on the common route of the Ampang Line and Sri Petaling Line. The station was opened on 16 December 1996, as part of the first phase of the former STAR LRT system's opening, along with 13 adjoining stations along the Sultan Ismail to Ampang route.

== History ==
The station is named after and located at the rear of Plaza Rakyat, a large mixed-use development project that was stalled during the 1997 East Asian financial crisis. Due to its proximity to Plaza Rakyat when it was opened, the concourse level of the station was originally intended to directly link the south side of the complex.

With Plaza Rakyat incomplete, a 150-metre-long covered pedestrian bridge and walkway was provided to connect the station to the south of the nearby Pudu Sentral bus station. Due to the suspension of the construction project, the pedestrian bridge continues to serve as the only entrance and exit to the station to this day.

The station is located near the site of the old Sultan Street railway station.

=== Connection to MRT Kajang Line ===
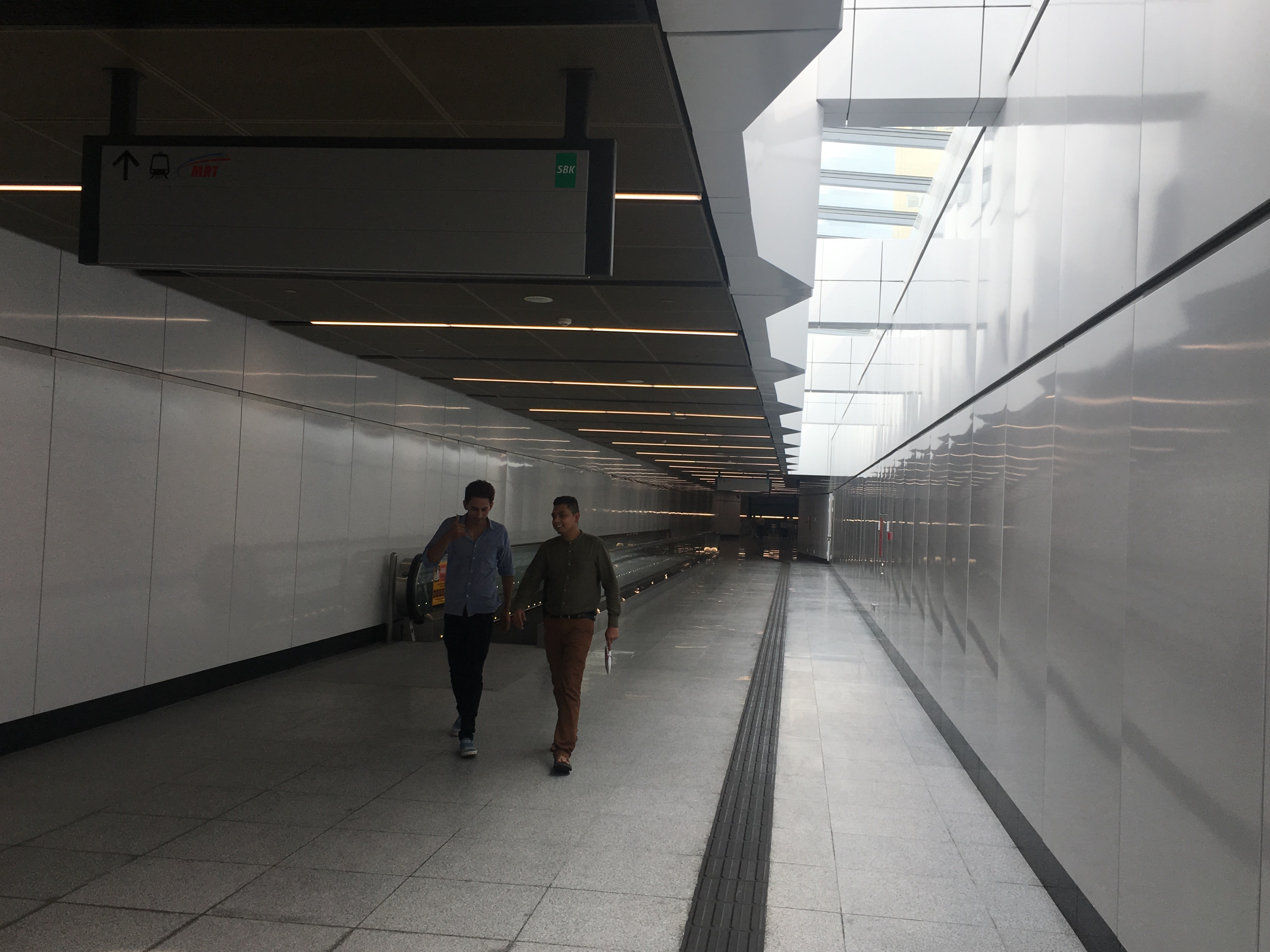
View of the linkway heading towards the Merdeka MRT station.

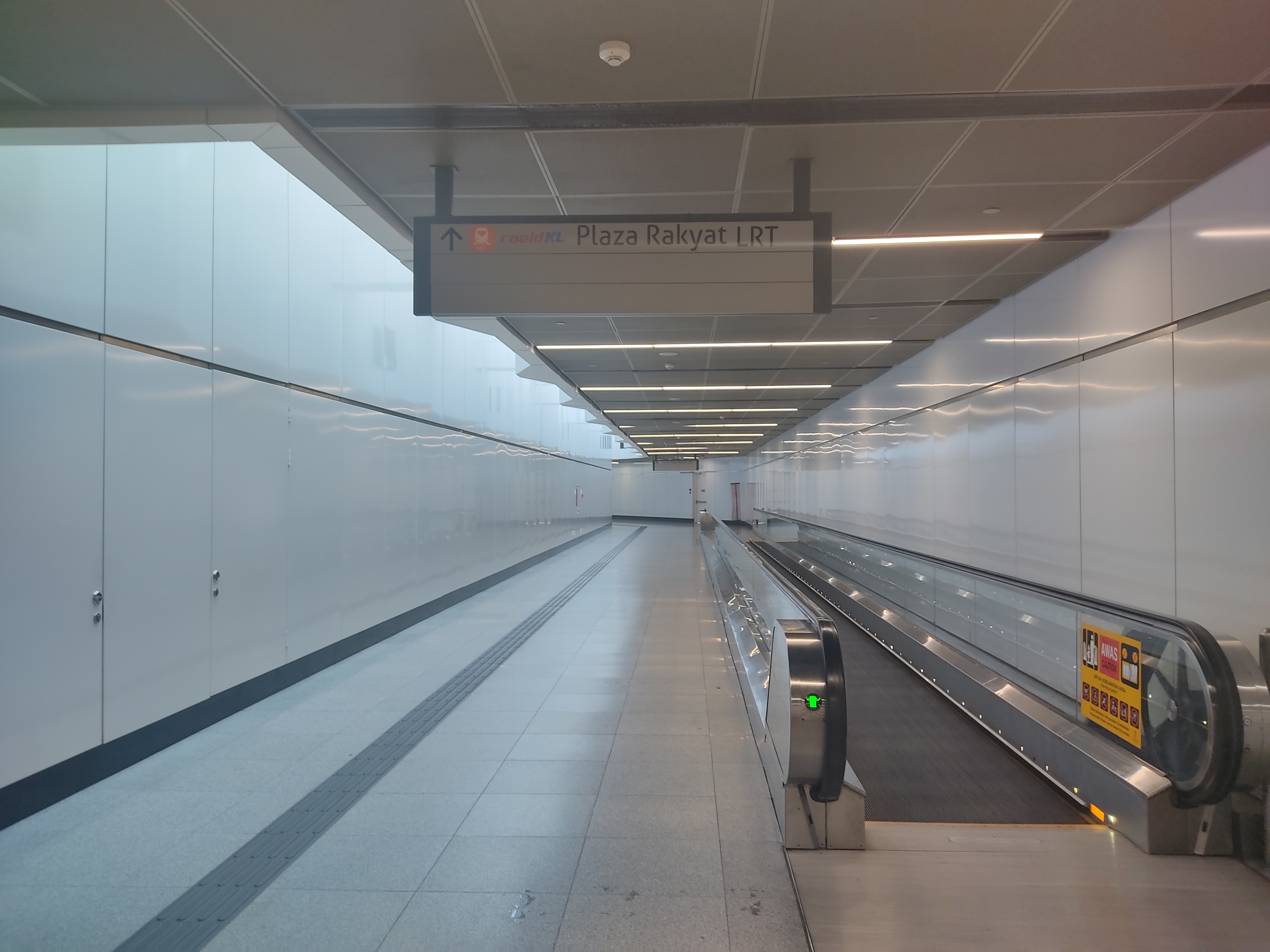
Travelator at the linkway towards the Plaza Rakyat LRT station.

The LRT station is an interchange station with the Merdeka MRT station since 17 July 2017. It was initially meant to be only a connecting station without a paid zone integration, but a later update included paid zone integration, where commuters do not need to tap out and purchase new tickets to transit to the other line. A covered and air-conditioned 180-metre pedestrian walkway was built, connecting the paid-area concourses of the two stations.

== Around the station ==
- Stadium Negara
- Victoria Institution (also served by AG9 SP9 MR4 Hang Tuah)
- Tun Perak Tower (formerly known as Maybank Tower)
- Petaling Street
- Pudu Sentral
- Confucian Private Secondary School
- Methodist Boys' School

== See also ==
- List of rail transit stations in Klang Valley
