= 1970 ABC Championship for Women =

1970 FIBA Women's Asia Cup
3rd Asian Women's Basketball Championship

Tournament details
- Host country: Malaysia
- Dates: October 30 – November 11
- Teams: 10 (from all Asian confederations)
- Venue: 1 (in 1 host city)

Final positions
- Champions: Japan (1st title)

Tournament statistics
- MVP: (Japan) Takeko Arakaki

The 1970 Asian Basketball Confederation Championship for Women were held in Kuala Lumpur, Malaysia.

== Results ==
Team	Pld	W	L	PF	PA	PD	Pts
Japan	9	9	0	945	296	+649	18
South Korea	9	8	1	935	296	+639	17
Taiwan	9	7	2	823	445	+378	16
Malaysia	9	6	3	494	598	−104	15
Indonesia	9	5	4	586	698	−112	14
Thailand	9	4	5	506	577	−71	13
Singapore	9	3	6	387	666	−279	12
Hong Kong	9	2	7	410	676	−266	11
South Vietnam	9	1	8	314	644	−330	10
India	9	0	9	402	906	−504	9

October 30
20:00

Malaysia	65–44	South Vietnam
Scoring by half: 30–21, 35–23

Stadium Negara, Kuala Lumpur

October 30
21:30

Thailand	28–113	South Korea
Scoring by half: 16–64, 12–49

Stadium Negara, Kuala Lumpur

October 31
18:00

Hong Kong	64–44	India
Scoring by half: 34–15, 30–29

Stadium Negara, Kuala Lumpur

October 31
20:00

Indonesia	54–91	Taiwan
Scoring by half: 28–42, 26–49

Stadium Negara, Kuala Lumpur

October 31
21:30

Singapore	20–109	Japan
Scoring by half: 6–61, 14–48

Stadium Negara, Kuala Lumpur

November 1
14:00

South Vietnam	8–98	South Korea
Scoring by half: 4–45, 4–53

Stadium Negara, Kuala Lumpur

November 1
15:30

Thailand	71–24	Singapore
Scoring by half: 29–14, 42–10

Stadium Negara, Kuala Lumpur

November 1
18:00

India	53–85	Malaysia
Scoring by half: 30–38, 23–47

Stadium Negara, Kuala Lumpur

November 1
19:30

Indonesia	33–137	Japan
Scoring by half: 17–70, 16–67

Stadium Negara, Kuala Lumpur

November 1
21:00

Hong Kong	41–108	Taiwan
Scoring by half: 16–47, 25–61

Stadium Negara, Kuala Lumpur

November 3
14:00

Indonesia	75–47	Singapore
Scoring by half: 40–18, 35–29

Stadium Negara, Kuala Lumpur

November 3
15:30

Hong Kong	37–106	Japan
Scoring by half: 14–52, 23–54

Stadium Negara, Kuala Lumpur

November 3
18:00

South Vietnam	28–64	Thailand
Scoring by half: 12–30, 16–34

Stadium Negara, Kuala Lumpur

November 3
19:30

India	25–152	South Korea
Scoring by half: 17–69, 8–83

Stadium Negara, Kuala Lumpur

November 3
21:00

Malaysia	42–98	Taiwan
Scoring by half: 21–50, 21–48

Stadium Negara, Kuala Lumpur

November 4
14:00

South Korea	130–38	Indonesia
Scoring by half: 65–26, 65–12

Stadium Negara, Kuala Lumpur

November 4
15:30

Malaysia	68–43	Hong Kong
Scoring by half: 26–21, 42–22

Stadium Negara, Kuala Lumpur

November 4
18:00

Taiwan	98–26	South Vietnam
Scoring by half: 49–12, 49–14

Stadium Negara, Kuala Lumpur

November 4
19:30

Singapore	71–47	India
Scoring by half: 32–14, 39–33

Stadium Negara, Kuala Lumpur

November 4
21:00

Japan	96–24	Thailand
Scoring by half: 47–13, 49–11

Stadium Negara, Kuala Lumpur

November 5
14:00

Singapore	39–96	Taiwan
Scoring by half: 16–44, 23–52

Stadium Negara, Kuala Lumpur

November 5
15:30

Japan	152–28	India
Scoring by half: 79–22, 73–6

Stadium Negara, Kuala Lumpur

November 5
18:00

Thailand	57–44	Hong Kong
Scoring by half: 30–22, 27–22

Stadium Negara, Kuala Lumpur

November 5
19:30

Indonesia	71–47	South Vietnam
Scoring by half: 41–18, 30–29

Stadium Negara, Kuala Lumpur

November 5
21:00

South Korea	96–27	Malaysia
Scoring by half: 48–13, 48–14

Stadium Negara, Kuala Lumpur

November 7
14:00

South Vietnam	45–53	Hong Kong
Scoring by half: 28–29, 17–24

Stadium Negara, Kuala Lumpur

November 7
15:30

Indonesia	104–60	India
Scoring by half: 42–28, 62–32

Stadium Negara, Kuala Lumpur

November 7
18:00

South Korea	118–26	Singapore
Scoring by half: 58–12, 60–14

Stadium Negara, Kuala Lumpur

November 7
19:30

Malaysia	64–56	Thailand
Scoring by half: 29–30, 35–26

Stadium Negara, Kuala Lumpur

November 7
21:00

Taiwan	59–91	Japan
Scoring by half: 20–47, 39–44

Stadium Negara, Kuala Lumpur

November 8
14:00

Singapore	44–57	Malaysia
Scoring by half: 22–28, 22–29

Stadium Negara, Kuala Lumpur

November 8
15:30

Hong Kong	24–101	South Korea
Scoring by half: 11–45, 13–56

Stadium Negara, Kuala Lumpur

November 8
18:00

Japan	88–18	South Vietnam
Scoring by half: 40–12, 48–6

Stadium Negara, Kuala Lumpur

November 8
19:30

Thailand	71–72 (OT)	Indonesia
Scoring by half: 30–30, 35–35 Overtime: 6–7

Stadium Negara, Kuala Lumpur

November 8
21:00

India	31–134	Taiwan
Scoring by half: 19–66, 12–68

Stadium Negara, Kuala Lumpur

November 9
14:00

India	59–86	Thailand
Scoring by half: 24–50, 35–36

Stadium Negara, Kuala Lumpur

November 9
15:30

South Vietnam	40–52	Singapore
Scoring by half: 17–19, 23–33

Stadium Negara, Kuala Lumpur

November 9
18:00

Indonesia	83–51	Hong Kong
Scoring by half: 47–25, 36–26

Stadium Negara, Kuala Lumpur

November 9
19:30

Malaysia	22–108	Japan
Scoring by half: 14–64, 8–44

Stadium Negara, Kuala Lumpur

November 9
21:00

Taiwan	62–72	South Korea
Scoring by half: 35–31, 27–41

Stadium Negara, Kuala Lumpur

November 10
13:00

Malaysia	64–56	Indonesia
Scoring by half: 28–26, 36–30

Stadium Negara, Kuala Lumpur

November 10
14:30

India	55–58	South Vietnam
Scoring by half: 28–26, 27–32

Stadium Negara, Kuala Lumpur

November 10
16:00

Singapore	64–53	Hong Kong
Scoring by half: 33–24, 31–29

Stadium Negara, Kuala Lumpur

November 10
19:00

Thailand	49–77	Taiwan
Scoring by half: 24–32, 25–45

Stadium Negara, Kuala Lumpur

November 10
20:30

South Korea	55–58	Japan
Scoring by half: 26–28, 29–30

Stadium Negara, Kuala Lumpur

== Final standing ==
Qualified for the 1971 FIBA World Championship for Women

Rank	Team	Record
1st place, gold medalist(s)	Japan	9–0
2nd place, silver medalist(s)	South Korea	8–1
3rd place, bronze medalist(s)	Taiwan	7–2
4	Malaysia	6–3
5	Indonesia	5–4
6	Thailand	4–5
7	Singapore	3–6
8	Hong Kong	2–7
9	South Vietnam	1–8
10	India	0–9

== Awards ==
1970 Asian champions

Japan
First title

- Most Valuable Player: (Japan) Takeko Arakaki
