= List of stadiums in Malaysia =

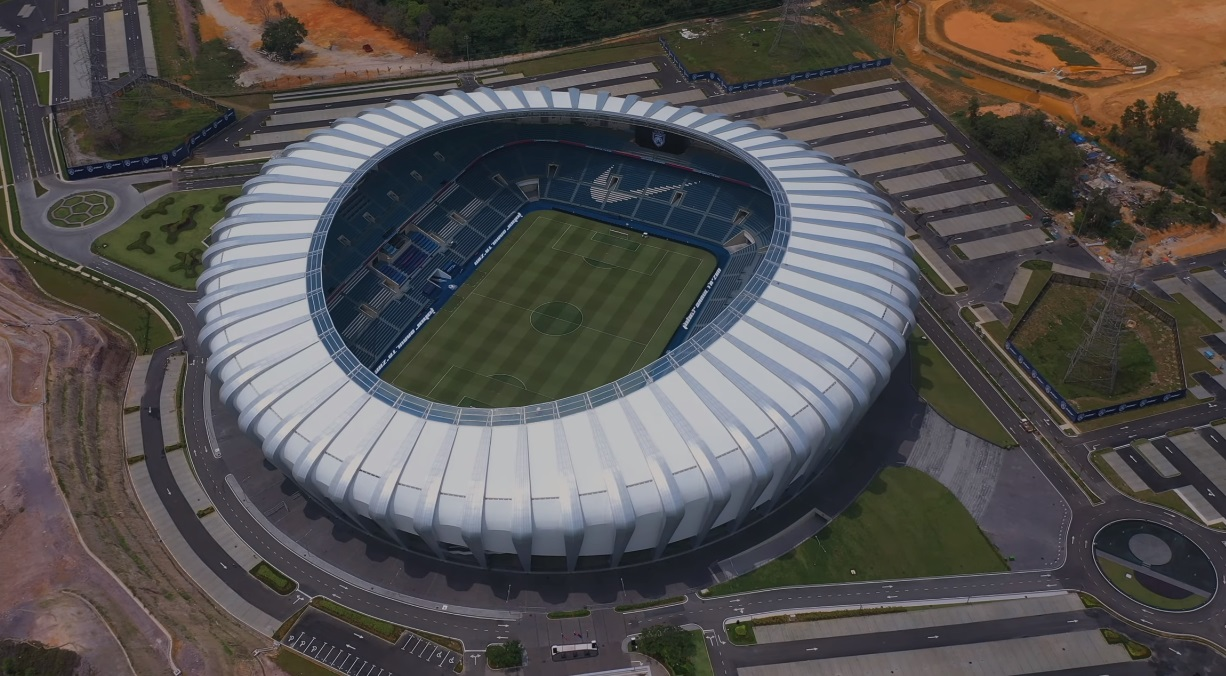
The 40,000-capacity Sultan Ibrahim Stadium is the home of Johor Darul Ta'zim.

This is a list of stadiums in Malaysia. Stadiums with a capacity of 2,000 or higher are included. Most of the stadiums are used for association football, the most popular sport in Malaysia. Some of the stadiums are also used for events like athletics, concerts and field hockey.

== Current stadiums ==
#	Image	Stadium	Capacity	City	State	Home team	Opened	Notes
1		National Stadium	87,411	Kuala Lumpur	Kuala Lumpur	Malaysia national football team	1996	The place where 1998 Commonwealth Games and 2017 SEA Games in Kuala Lumpur takes place. It is the biggest stadium in Southeast Asia by capacity, third biggest stadium on the Asian continent, and eighth largest worldwide.
2		Shah Alam Stadium	80,372	Shah Alam	Selangor	PKNS F.C. Selangor F.C.	1994	Former biggest stadium in Malaysia.
3		Sultan Mizan Zainal Abidin Stadium	50,000	Kuala Terengganu	Terengganu	Terengganu F.C.	2008	Built to host the SUKMA Games. The largest stadium in the east coast region of Peninsular Malaysia.
4		Tuanku Abdul Rahman Stadium	45,000	Seremban	Negeri Sembilan	Negeri Sembilan F.C.	1992	In 2004 the capacity of stadium has been upgraded from 20,000 to 40,000 people due to Sukma X.
5		Perak Stadium	42,000	Ipoh	Perak	Perak F.C.	1965	
6		Darul Makmur Stadium	41,895	Kuantan	Pahang	Sri Pahang F.C.	1970	
7		State of Penang Stadium	40,000	Batu Kawan	Penang		2000	
8		Hang Jebat Stadium	40,000	Krubong	(Malacca) Melaka	Melaka United F.C.	2004	
9		Sultan Ibrahim Stadium	40,000	Iskandar Puteri	Johor	Johor DT F.C.	2020	
10		Sarawak Stadium	40,000	Kuching	Sarawak	Kuching City F.C.	1997	
11		Likas Stadium	35,000	Kota Kinabalu	Sabah	Sabah F.C.	1983	
12	Stadium Darul Aman, Alor Star	Darul Aman Stadium	32,387	Alor Star	Kedah	Kedah F.C.	1962	
13		Tan Sri Dato Hj Hassan Yunos Stadium	30,000	Johor Bahru	Johor	Johor DT F.C. II	1964	
14		Sarawak State Stadium	26,000	Kuching	Sarawak	Sarawak United FC	1991	
15		Independence Stadium	25,000	Kuala Lumpur	Kuala Lumpur		1957	Erected for Malaysia's declaration of independence on 31 August 1957. It was also used as the venue for concerts.
16		Petaling Jaya Stadium	25,000	Petaling Jaya	Selangor	Petaling Jaya City FC	1996	
17		City Stadium	25,000	Georgetown	Penang	Penang F.C.	1956	The oldest built stadium still in use in Malaysia, it was built in 1956 by the British government.
18		Tun Abdul Razak Stadium	25,000	Bandar Tun Razak, Jengka	Pahang	FELDA United F.C.	2015	
19		Sultan Mohammad IV Stadium	30,000 (from 2024)	Kota Bharu	Kelantan	Kelantan F.C.	1967	
20		Tuanku Syed Putra Stadium	20,000	Kangar	Perlis	Perlis Northern Lions F.C.	1995	
21		Majlis Perbandaran Selayang Stadium	20,000	Selayang	Selangor		1999	
22		Kuala Lumpur Stadium	18,000	Kuala Lumpur	Kuala Lumpur	Kuala Lumpur F.C.		
23		Sultan Ismail Nasiruddin Shah Stadium	15,000	Kuala Terengganu	Terengganu	Terengganu F.C. II	1967	
24		Pasir Gudang Corporation Stadium	15,000	Pasir Gudang	Johor	Johor DT F.C. III		
25		Malawati Stadium	13,000	Shah Alam	Selangor		1998	Used as boxing event during 1998 Commonwealth Games
26		National Hockey Stadium	12,000	Kuala Lumpur	Kuala Lumpur	Malaysia men's national field hockey team, Malaysia women's national field hockey team	1998	
27		SPICE Arena	13,000	Bayan Lepas	Penang		1997	The 2000 SUKMA games is one of the first events held at SPICE Arena. It is the largest and the most comprehensive multi-purpose indoor venue in Penang.
28		Axiata Arena	10,000	Kuala Lumpur	Kuala Lumpur			
29		Stadium Negara	10,000	Kuala Lumpur	Kuala Lumpur		1962	
30		Langkawi Stadium	10,000	Langkawi	Kedah		1991	
31		Hang Tuah Stadium	5,000	Malacca	Malacca	SAMB F.C.	1954	
32		Taman Daya Hockey Stadium	5,000	Tebrau	Johor			
33		Sibu Indoor Stadium	4,250	Sibu	Sarawak		2016	The venue for 2017 Malaysia Masters Grand Prix Gold.
34		Temerloh Mini Stadium	3,000	Temerloh	Pahang	The 2nd Home Ground for Pahang F.C. and Shahzan Muda FC	1997	
35		Panasonic Sports Complex Stadium	2,000	Shah Alam	Selangor	Shah Alam Antlers	1991	

== See also ==
- Lists of stadiums
