= Independence Stadium (Malaysia) =

Multi-purpose stadium in Kuala Lumpur, Malaysia

Coordinates: 3°8′20″N 101°42′2″E

- Stadium Merdeka
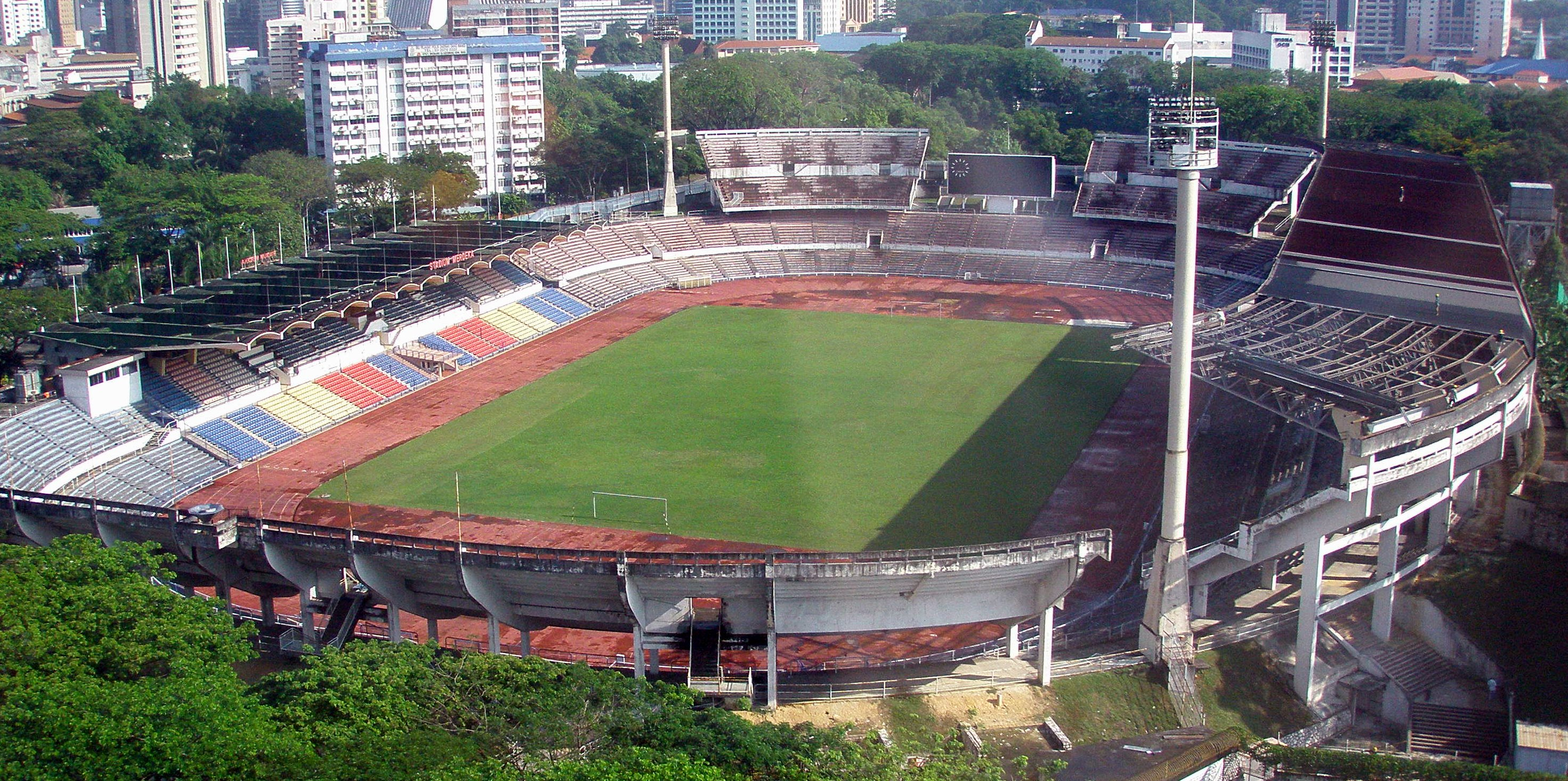
- The stadium in 2007
- Interactive map of Independence Stadium
- Address: Jalan Stadium, Presint Merdeka 118, 50118
- Location: Kuala Lumpur, Malaysia
- Owner: Permodalan Nasional Berhad (PNB)
- Operator: The Merdeka Heritage Trust
- Capacity: 25,000
- Surface: Grass pitch, track
- Scoreboard: Manual scoreboard
- Public transit: KG17 Merdeka; MR3 Maharajalela; AG8 SP8 Plaza Rakyat via KG17 Merdeka

Construction
- Groundbreaking: 25 September 1956
- Opened: 30 August 1957; 69 years ago
- Closed: 2016
- Reopened: 17 August 2024; 2 years ago
- Cost: RM2,300,000
- Architect: Stanley Edward Jewkes
- Main contractors: K.C Boon and Cheah Co. Ltd.; Lim Quee and Sons

Tenants
- Selangor (1957–1994); Malaysia national football team (1957–1998); Star City; Selangor F.C. Women

The Independence Stadium or Merdeka Stadium (Malay: Stadium Merdeka) is a stadium in Kuala Lumpur, Malaysia. It is known as the site of the formal declaration of independence of the Federation of Malaya on 31 August 1957. The stadium is also the site of the proclamation of Malaysia on 16 September 1963.

Currently owned by Permodalan Nasional Berhad (PNB), the stadium has a lower and an upper terrace, with a total capacity of 25,000. It has 14 tunnels entrances, a covered stand, 50 turnstiles and four floodlight towers. The stadium was designed by American architect Stanley Jewkes, under the instruction of the first Prime Minister of Malaysia, Tunku Abdul Rahman. Upon its completion, the stadium holds the world record for the tallest prestressed floodlight towers and the biggest cantilever shell roofs. The stadium was the largest stadium in Southeast Asia at the time of completion.

The stadium was the principal venue in Kuala Lumpur for celebrations and sporting events until 1998 when the Bukit Jalil National Stadium was built for the 16th Commonwealth Games. Prior to that, the stadium was the home ground for the Malaysian national football team. The stadium witnessed the historic qualifying match of the 1980 Olympic Games, when the national football team last qualified the Olympic Games. However, due to the boycott against the Soviet Union led by the United States, the country did not participate in the final tournament. The stadium was also the venue for the Merdeka Tournament until 1995. Besides that, the stadium had hosted three out of the five SEA Games held in Kuala Lumpur. The stadium also hosted the fight between the legendary American boxer Muhammad Ali and British-Australian boxer Joe Bugner in 1975, prior to the Thrilla in Manila. In 1975, the stadium also hosted the Hockey World Cup final between Pakistan and India.

The stadium is currently a national heritage building. In 2008, the Independence Stadium received the UNESCO Asia-Pacific Award for Excellence for Heritage Conservation owing to its cultural significance and embodiment of a unique independence declaration event.

== History ==
=== Background ===
Since the 1930s, the Football Association of Selangor, commonly referred to as Selangor, had been urging the government for a professional football stadium to be built. The request had been ignored as there is in fact a MAHA Stadium, the first stadium of Selangor in collaboration with MAHA (Malayan Agri-Horticultural Association), is still there located at Jalan Ampang at that time. However, the MAHA Stadium was ruined by the Japanese army in the World War II. After the war, the FAS and the Football Association of Malaya (FAM) stepped up their efforts to get a new stadium as the MAHA Stadium in Jalan Ampang is now unusable. After Tunku Abdul Rahman was elected as president of the two associations in 1951, both associations fought hard to have a first-class stadium built.

In 1952, an ad-hoc committee was formed by the Kuala Lumpur Municipal Commissioners to study the proposal, and a report was released three months later. Several proposals were also brought up to the Federal Legislative Council on this matter, including Tunku himself, but was blocked by the council. After the winning of the Alliance Party in the first general election in Malaya, Tunku, who was now the Chief Minister, started an advisory committee led by E.M. McDonald to study the possibility of building a stadium. On 4 June 1956, a total of 160 proposal plan was submitted to the government.

On 2 May 1956, Tunku and McDonald started looking for suitable sites for the stadium, one of the first places they visited was the Chin Woo stadium. While standing on the tower of the stadium, Tunku saw a few athletes practicing near the Coronation Park, and asked "Don't you think it would make an ideal spot for Stadium Merdeka?" Although McDonald was concerned about the traffic congestion that might arise in the future, Tunku insisted that it was the perfect spot for the country's first stadium.

The site was a Chinese cemetery before it became the oldest golf course in Kuala Lumpur, which had been abandoned since 1921. The site was then later called "Coronation Park" when George VI was crowned as the King of United Kingdom. Before it was decided to build a stadium on that site, several quarters were planned to be built on the site by the Royal Malaysia Police. The uneven ground of the site means that excavation work had to be carried out before it could be constructed. The construction of the stadium would also mean that a small part of the school ground of Victoria Institution would be acquired. Despite McDonald's efforts to persuade Tunku to choose another site for the stadium, Tunku insisted on building the stadium there.

On 11 July, Tunku bought this up to the Legislative Council and gained permission from it. Four days later, the project was transferred to the Malayan Public Works Department.

=== Construction ===
The stadium was constructed from 25 September 1956 to 21 August 1957, and was designed by the then Director of Public Works Department, Stanley Edward Jewkes. Several engineers such as Lee Kwok Thye, Chan Sai Soo and Peter Low were also involved in the project. The cornerstone of the stadium was laid by Tunku himself on 15 February 1957.

Due to budget constraints, most of the construction materials were made locally, which meant that imported materials such as structural steels had to be avoided. To ensure that the stadium would be finished in time, the designing was done by "fast-track" method, which means that after each element of the design was finished, it was immediately constructed.

The stadium was constructed as an earthed amphitheatre, which means that a part of the stadium is below ground level. The excavated soil was then transferred to the site of Masjid Negara which was originally a valley and was subjected to flooding issues. When the earthworks and excavation were completed, designs of the terrace seating had already been done, and the construction of it began immediately. At the same time, the designing of the covered stands, the upper terraces and the stairs were carried on by the architects.

Two contractors were involved in the construction, Lim Quee for the construction of the main covered stands, while Boon & Cheah were responsible for the terrace and the tunnel entrances. Besides designing the stadium, Stanley Jewkes was also responsible for the traffic planning around the stadium. Other than Stanley, architect Edgar Green was also involved in the designing of the interior facilities such as the toilets and the canteen facilities of the restaurant.

The stadium held two world records upon its completion: the tallest prestressed floodlight towers at 120 feet and the biggest cantilever shell roofs. The floodlight towers, constructed from Hume culvert pipes, was also the first prestressed tower in the world which was made from precast culvert pipe units. Another interesting feat accomplished at the time is that all four towers were erected without using a crane. The shell roof for the grandstand, made out of concrete, was chosen as it was both economically affordable and aesthetically beautiful. Although the strength of the cantilever roofs were tested before the ceremony, Stanley was concerned that the roof might be unable to withstand the vibrations caused by the firing of the cannons during the ceremony, but it did not happen and the event went well.

Engineer Lee Kwok Thye credited the Kongsi Woman, also known as Lai Sui Mui (Note: Which means "mud girls" in Cantonese.) for their role in the construction. The women were responsible for carrying concrete buckets from the ground up to the structures being constructed, where it was then poured into the framework.

They come to the site in black clothes, usually on bicycles. Their sleeves were extra long so that they could use them as gloves. They wore big straw hats with a hood. There were big gangs of them, each carrying two small buckets of concrete that was premixed at ground level. They walked up a ramp to take them right up to the top of the construction. A man would be up there to receive the concrete, pour it in, they'd return, and then continue in a chain system.

— Lee Kwok Thye

=== Opening and the declaration of independence ===
The stadium was completed on 21 August 1957, while the opening ceremony was held on 30 August 1957, a day before the country declared independence. At the time of completion, it was the largest stadium in the Southeast Asia. The opening ceremony was opened by Tunku Abdul Rahman, which was witnessed by over 15,000 spectators, including foreign athletes. It was also Tunku himself who placed the foundation stone on 15 February 1957. The ceremony includes a mass drill performance by 1000 students.

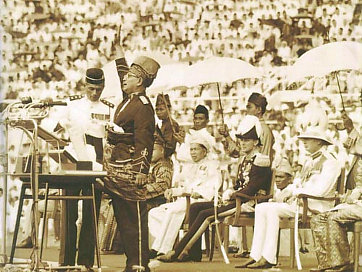
Tunku Abdul Rahman proclaiming "Independent" in the stadium

On 31 August 1957, power was transferred from the British Empire to the newly independent Malayan government. (Note: At the time of its independence, Malaya excluded Singapore, Sarawak and Sabah.) More than 20,000 people crowded into the stadium, which was built specifically for this occasion. The ceremony was attended by Prince Henry, Duke of Gloucester, representing the Queen of the United Kingdom, the Malay rulers of the nine states, (Note: Which are Perlis, Kedah, Perak, Selangor, Negeri Sembilan, Johor, Pahang, Kelantan and Terengganu.) the last High Commissioner of Malaya Sir Donald MacGillivray, foreign dignitaries, members of the federal cabinet and Tunku Abdul Rahman himself. Following the handover of the instrument of the independence from Prince Henry to Tunku, the prime minister read out the Declaration of Independence, followed by the iconic seven shouts of "Merdeka" by Tunku. Following that, the national anthem was sung for the first time by a multiracial choir led by Tony Fonseka, while the national flag was raised by Oliver Cuthbert Samuel. The ceremony was continued with an azan call and a thanksgiving prayer, as well as a gun salute. A mass drill were also performed by the students on the event.

=== Declaration of Malaysia ===
On 16 September 1963, the stadium was the site of the proclamation of the formation of the Malaysia Federation. The event was witnessed by more than 30,000 audience and it was attended by the Yang di-Pertuan Agong, the Malay rulers, the Governor of Penang, Malacca, Singapore, Sarawak and Sabah, as well as the cabinet members, foreign diplomats and invited guests. The Proclamation of Malaysia, which was handed by the Yang di-Pertuan Agong, was read out by the Prime Minister, Tunku Abdul Rahman. He then shouted "Merdeka" seven times, which was echoed by the crowd. This was followed by the playing of the nobat orchestra and the national anthem played by the Royal Malaysia Police Band. It was then followed by a 101-gun salute by the first round of the Federation artillery. The event ended with the prayer by the Mufti of Negeri Sembilan, Ahmad Mohammad Said.

=== Plans for demolition ===
The role of the stadium as the principal venue for celebrations and sporting events in Kuala Lumpur was replaced by the National Stadium built in the mid-1990s.

The stadium and its land were given to United Engineers Malaysia (UEM) which had intended to redevelop the land into a RM1 billion entertainment and office complex. However, the company did not proceed with the redevelopment due to public outcry and the company's financial difficulties due to the late 1990s Asian economic crisis. The stadium was now owned by Permodalan Nasional Berhad (PNB).

Several options were suggested following the acquirement of the site by PNB, such as redeveloping the stadium for smaller sporting activities, building a sport museum at the site, or relocate it to another site. Nonetheless, the stadium remained as a site for sporting events and concert until this day.

=== Renovations and restoration ===
The stadium had been through several renovations. First in 1974 when the concrete upper tiers were added to increase the stadium capacity to 32,800 seats. The project costs about RM 4.5 million. In 1983, the floodlights of the stadium were replaced to make television colour transmission possible. The seating capacity of the stadium was further increased in early 1986 with the addition of upper tiers rising into the airspace on the north, east and south terraces. Prior to the 1989 SEA Games, the grandstand was changed and the game's torch platform was built, were involved a set of grand steps leading up to the torch. The renovation, which cost RM 5.3 million, also includes the laying of new tracks, repairs to the roofs, enclosing sections of seating and repainting the seating terraces such that the stadium was ready for the Games.

In 2007, the stadium underwent massive renovations to restore its 1957 look. With that, the 45,000-capacity stadium was reduced to 20,000, which meant that several of the upper terrace blocks built over the years were demolished. Besides that, the entire stadium was to be decorated as the state it was when Tunku proclaimed independence, which included the word "Merdeka" written in the stadium and the original seating arrangements of the Malay Rulers, the Queen's representatives and officers. The paintworks, main pavilion, two VIP rooms and the changing rooms were to be restored to its original state as well. The project, which costs RM2 million, was led by PNB.

=== Merdeka PNB 118 ===
In December 2009, it was announced that PNB would be building a hundred-floored skyscraper on the site between Independence Stadium and Nation Stadium. The project was officially launched by the then Prime Minister Najib Razak in September 2016. Formerly named as the Warisan Merdeka, the project was estimated to be finished by 2021. The tower, when completed, would be the second tallest building in the world and tallest in Southeast Asia. The tower would include 83 levels of office space, 16 levels of luxury hotel, and the rest of the floors would be occupied observation deck, restaurants, sky lobby, podium and amenities. Besides that, the project would also include a shopping mall and residential areas.

The tower was built on the Tunku Abdul Rahman Park (also known as Merdeka Park), which was built alongside the Independence Stadium. Such a move was criticized as the park was supposed to act as a heritage buffer zone. Plus, the park was also a recreation park for the residents in Kuala Lumpur for generations. The project might as well worsen the traffic congestion of that area. There was also concern that the schools nearby might be affected by the project and was forced to be relocated.

== Sporting events ==
=== Football ===
Prior to the completion of the National Stadium, the Independence Stadium was once the home ground for both the national football team (1957–1998) and Selangor FA (1957–1994), and was used temporarily by Kuala Lumpur FA in 1997. Besides that, it was also the venue for the annual Independence Football Tournament and most of the finals of the Malaysia Cup. The stadium had also hosted all the football matches for the 1965 SEAP Games, 1971 SEAP Games and the 1977 SEA Games, as well as the finals for the 1989 SEA Games.

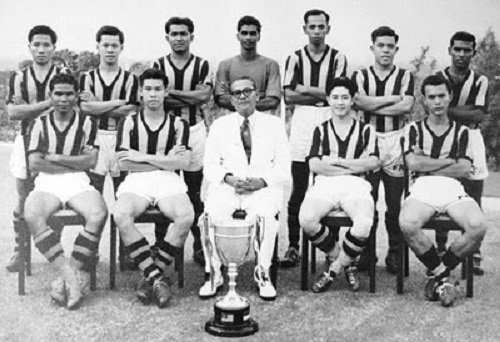
Tunku along with the Malayan national football team after they had won their first Merdeka Cup in 1958

The first match of the stadium was the opening match of the 1957 Independence Football Tournament, on 31 August 1957, between Hong Kong League XI and Cambodia. The Hong Kong League XI became the first team to win at Independence Stadium beating Cambodia with 6–2. The first goal was scored by Law Kwok-tai. On the next day, the Malayan national team play its first game at the stadium on a match against Burma, which finished 5–2. The national team will win its first Merdeka Cup in 1958 on a match against South Vietnam.

The first Malaya Cup final held at the stadium was played on October 19, 1957, between Selangor and Perak. Perak won the game by 3–2, becoming the first club to win a final at the Independence Stadium. Perak also won the first Malaysia Cup at Independence Stadium after the cup was renamed in 1967. The stadium continued to host the next 36 Malaysia Cup finals until the 1990s.

The stadium had also witnessed the first match played by the newly formed Malaysia national football team, which is a combination of the Malaya and Singapore players (Singapore left in 1965 after the separation of Singapore with Malaysia). The match took place on 8 August 1963 (although the federation only existed after 16 September 1963) on the first round of the 1963 Merdeka Tournament against Japan. The team was defeated by 3–4.

The first South East Asia Peninsular Games football tournament held in Independence Stadium was the opening match between Thailand and South Vietnam on December 15, with Thailand winning the game by 2–1. The stadium will host the rest of the matches as well as the final held on December 22, which ended with a tie between Burma and Thailand. In 1989, the Malaysia national football team won their fourth SEA Games goal medal, the first at the stadium.

The first Olympic qualification match held at the stadium was the preliminary round between Malaysia and Thailand on 12 October 1964, which resulted a draw. In 1980, the stadium was the venue for the Olympics qualifying tournament. On 25 March, the stadium witnessed the qualification of Malaysia at the 1980 Olympic Games. The national team won the match against South Korea by 2–1, thus qualifying the Olympic Games for the second time. However, due to the boycott led by the United States, the country did not participate in the final tournament.

The first FIFA qualification match at the stadium was the match between Malaysia and South Korea on March 10, 1985.

Followed by the completion of the Shah Alam Stadium in 1994, both Selangor FA and the Malaysian national team moved to the newly built stadium. The national team will then move to the National Stadium after its completion in 1998.

The Malaysia Cup final was held again at the stadium since 1993, which was the match between Sarawak and Brunei in 1999, which resulted in a Brunei win 2–1. The stadium had never hosted any Malaysia Cup finals ever since.

In February 2015, Kuala Lumpur FA returned to Independence Stadium for the first time in 17 years for the team's opening Premier League match of the season against Sabah. The last international match played at the stadium saw the Malaysian team drawing 1–1 with Cambodia in October 2001.

=== Multi-sport event ===
The stadium was the venue of the Brunei Merdeka Games, which was held to commemorate the Independence day of Malaya. Several events, including the Pestabola Merdeka, were held from 30 August to 8 September 1957. Besides football, the stadium had held cycling, athletics and hockey competition which were a part of the Games. A similar event was held in 1963 when the Malaysia Federation was formed.

Operated by Perbadanan Stadium Merdeka (1963–1998), the stadium had also held four out of six of the SEA Games held in Kuala Lumpur. The stadium first host the Southeast Asia Games (known as the Southeast Asia Peninsular Games at that time) in 1965. Originally, Malaysia was planned to host the Games in 1967, however it was decided to be held in Malaysia after the original host, Laos had opted out due to financial difficulties. The stadium was the venue for the opening and closing ceremony, as well as athletics, football and cycling events. The stadium will continue to host the 1971, 1977 and 1989 editions.

The stadium had also hosted the first SUKMA Games in 1986. It will also be hosting the second SUKMA Games two years later.

=== Other sports ===
In 1975, the stadium had hosted the third Men's Hockey World Cup from 1 to 15 March 1975. India won its only Hockey World Cup after beating Pakistan by 2–1. The 1975 edition is also the Malaysian national team best performance, which won the fourth place in the event. The event was witnessed by over 50,000 spectators, despite the fact that the stadium had only 45,000 seats.

The stadium had also held the fight between Muhammad Ali and Joe Bugner on 1 July 1975. It was held as an exhibition bout as a part of the Far East tour. The match was held prior to the infamous Thrilla in Manila that was held three months later. About 20,000 spectators witnessed the fight in the stadium, including the Yang di-Pertuan Agong, the Prime Minister, several kings and governors, as well as Joe Frazier, Ali's former adversary. Ali won the fight by 73–67, 73–65 and 72–65 after the mandatory 15 rounds were over.

In athletics, the stadium was also used to held the 1991 Asian Athletics Championships, which was held in Kuala Lumpur. The event was held from 19 to 23 October. Aside from that, the stadium was also regularly used for national championships.

== Other events ==
=== Concerts ===
The Independence Stadium had also hosted major concerts. Uriah Heep held its first Malaysian concert at the stadium on 19 October 1983. Michael Jackson's HIStory World Tour filled the stadium to capacity. Jackson performed two sold-out concerts on 27 and 29 October 1996, respectively, in front of 55,000 people each night. (Note: It was the only time Michael Jackson performed in Malaysia.)

Linkin Park performed at the stadium in their Meteora World Tour on 15 October 2003. The concert was attended by over 28,000 audiences.

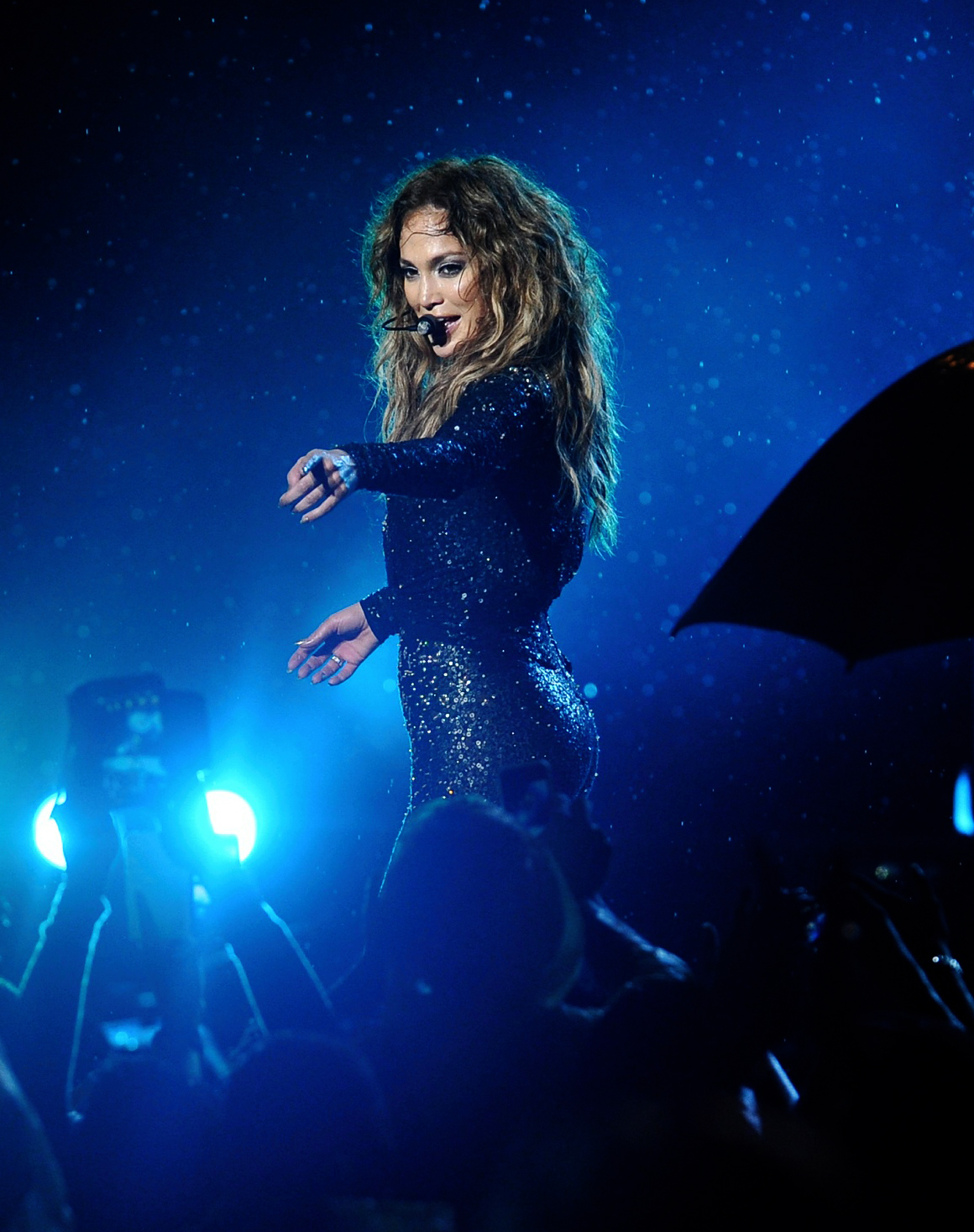
Jennifer Lopez in her Dance Again World Tour Live on 3 December 2012

Mariah Carey first perform at the stadium on 20 February 2004 as a part of her Charmbracelet World Tour. She returned to the stadium ten years later in her The Elusive Chanteuse Show on 22 October 2014.

Celine Dion performed on 13 April 2008 for a total audience of 48,000 as a part of her Taking Chances World Tour. Avril Lavigne played her first show at the stadium on 29 August 2008. She will return to the stadium again in her Black Star Tour in 2012, and again in 2014 as a part of The Avril Lavigne Tour.

Justin Bieber performed at the stadium as a part of his debut world tour on 21 April 2011. Other Western artists who have played the stadium includes Jennifer Lopez, Cliff Richards, Scorpions, Metallica, My Chemical Romance and Bon Jovi.

Taiwanese singer Jolin Tsai first performed at the stadium on her Myself World Tour on 11 June 2011. She returned to the stadium again for her Play World Tour on 16 July 2016. On the following year, Mandopop singer Wang Leehom held his Music-Man Tour on March 3. He will return to the stadium again on 16 March 2019 as a part of his Descendants of the Dragon 2060 World Tour.

Taiwanese singer Jay Chou first performed at the stadium in 2003 on The One World Tour. The singer performed again at the stadium two years later on his Incomparable World Tour. His third appearance at the stadium was on February 23 as a part of The World Tour. Chou will return for his Invincible World Tour on August 6, 2016.

K-pop group EXO played the stadium on 12 March 2016 as a part of their Exo Planet #2 - The Exo'luxion World Tour. The group will return again on 18 March 2017 on their Exo Planet #3 - The Exo'rdium World Tour. Indian composer A.R. Rahman performed his A.R. Rahman Live in Concert on 14 May 2016 at the stadium. On the same year, South Korean group Big Bang held their MADE (V.I.P) Tour fan meeting at the stadium. G-Dragon performed in the stadium on his own solo tour Act III: M.O.T.T.E World Tour on 17 September 2017.

Malaysian singer Michael Wong held his Lonely Planet Concert Tour on 10 November 2018 at the stadium. He was the first local singer to held a solo concert at the stadium. Other Asian singers that had performed at the stadium include Kelly Chen, Beyond, Faye Wong, Wonder Girls, Jacky Cheung and Mayday.

Other shows held in the stadium include:

- Philiac Concert for Peace, May 2011
- B.o.B, Far East Movement, Mizz Nina, Watsons Music Festival, 15 December 2012

=== Political demonstrations ===
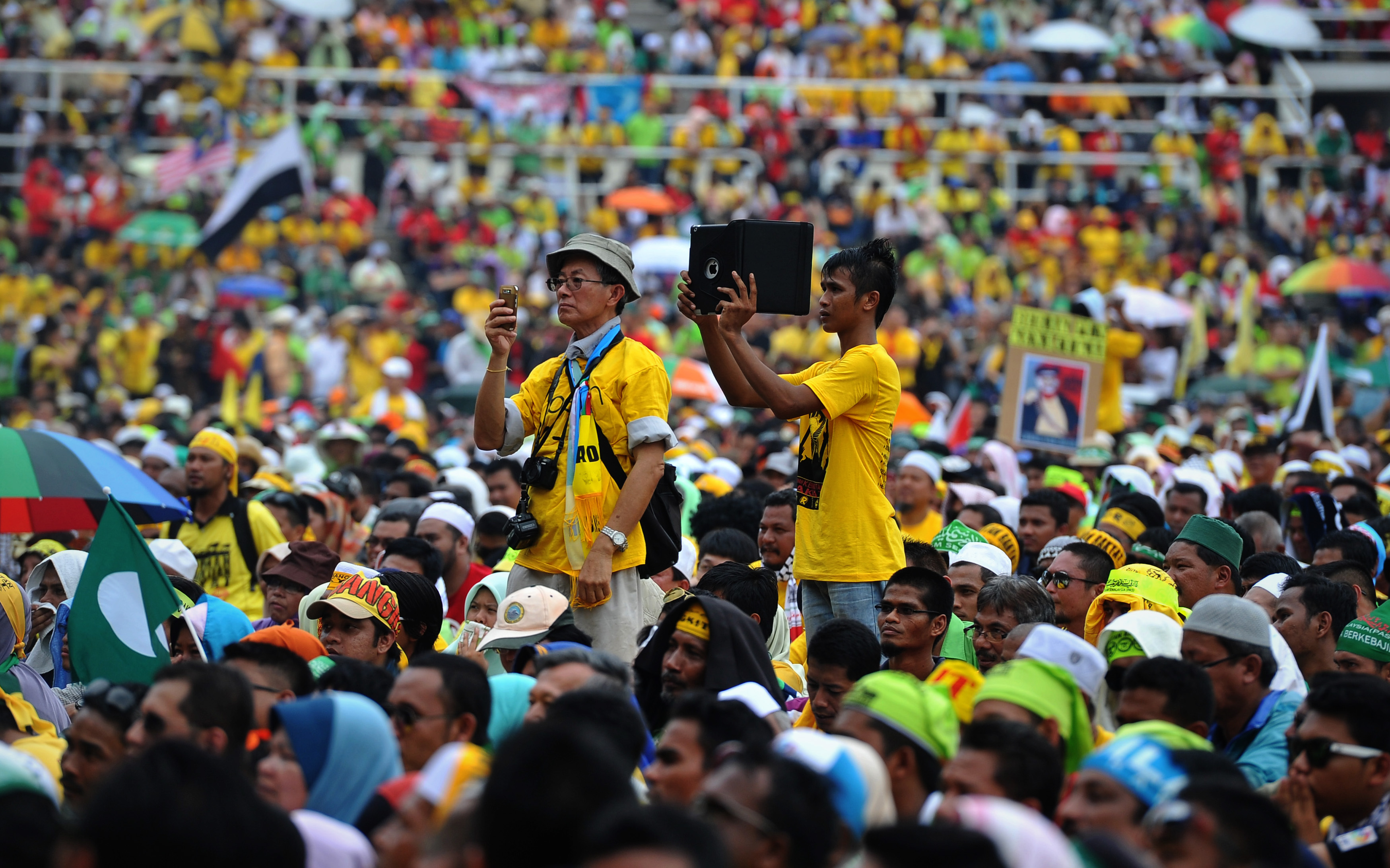
The People Uprising rally, held at the stadium

On 9 July 2011, protesters of the Bersih 2.0 rally marched to the Independence Stadium. The decision was made after the organisers had consulted the Yang di-Pertuan Agong. On 12 January 2013, The People's Uprising rally (Malay: Himpunan Kebangkitan Rakyat) was held in the stadium.

=== World records ===
The stadium had witnessed the largest silat lesson in the world on 29 August 2015. The lesson was participated by 12,393 participants and was directed by Grandmaster YM Syeikh Dr. Md Radzi bin Hanafi, who is the Pewaris Mutlak Silat Cekak from Persekutuan Seni Silat Cekak Pusaka Ustaz Hanafi Malaysia. It was held in conjunction with the National Day celebration on that year.

== Heritage conservation ==
In February 2003, Independence Stadium was named a national heritage building. In 2007, Independence Stadium underwent restoration to its original 1957 condition as part of Malaysia's 50th-anniversary plans to relive the moment when Tunku Abdul Rahman proclaimed independence there. The restoration was completed by December 2009. The restoration received the UNESCO Asia-Pacific 2008 Award of Excellence for Cultural Heritage Conservation.

== Transportation ==
The stadium is served by the Maharajalela Monorail station on the KL Monorail Line, situated next to one of the stadium's west exits. The station is situated between Tun Sambathan station and Hang Tuah station.

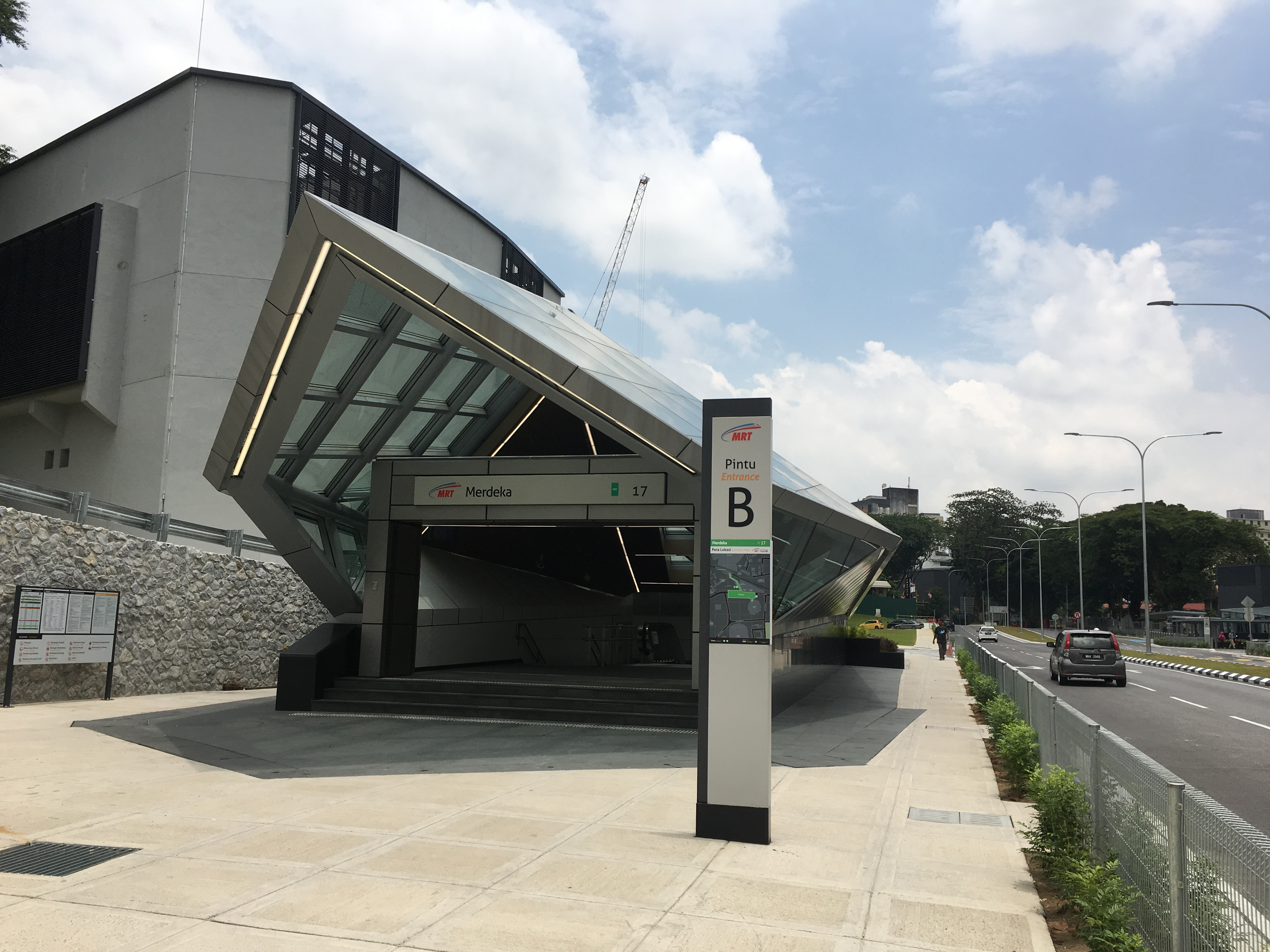
View of the entrance of the Merdeka MRT station

The stadium is also indirectly served by the Merdeka MRT station. The station is situated in between Pasar Seni MRT station and Bukit Bintang MRT station on the MRT Kajang Line. Although its name refers to the stadium, the station serves the adjacent Stadium Negara instead.

The stadium can also be reached via the LRT Ampang and Sri Petaling Lines at Plaza Rakyat LRT station. A 180-metre pedestrian linkway was built from the station to the Merdeka MRT station, allowing paid area integration between the 3 lines. The walkway is air-conditioned, brightly lit, and travelators were installed to ensure the comfort of the passengers.

The stadium can also be reached by bus. Located near the stadium, the Pasar Seni bus hub is the terminating stop for many bus lines in the Klang Valley.

== Gallery ==
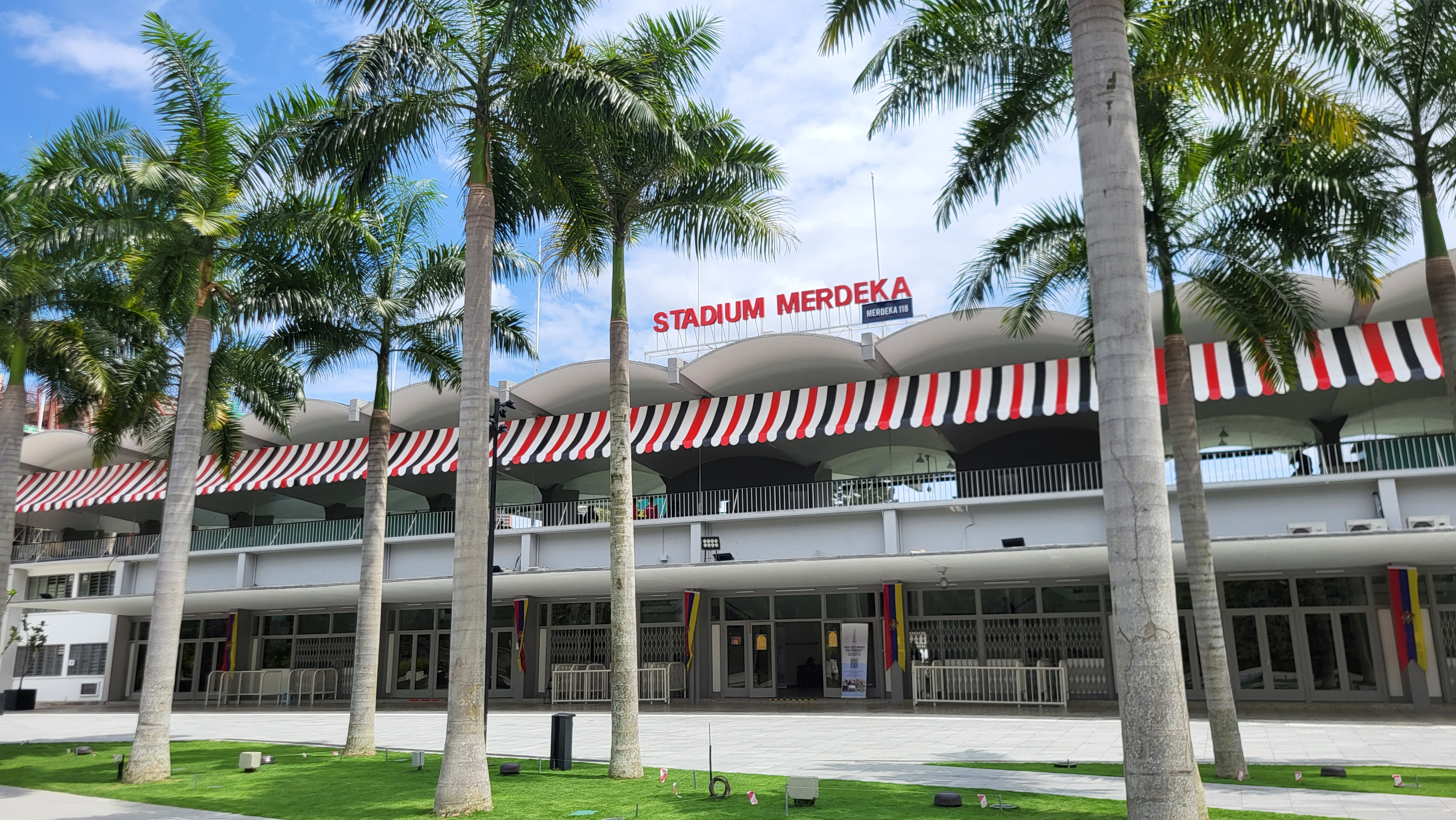
Main entrance as seen from Merdeka Boulevard at 118.

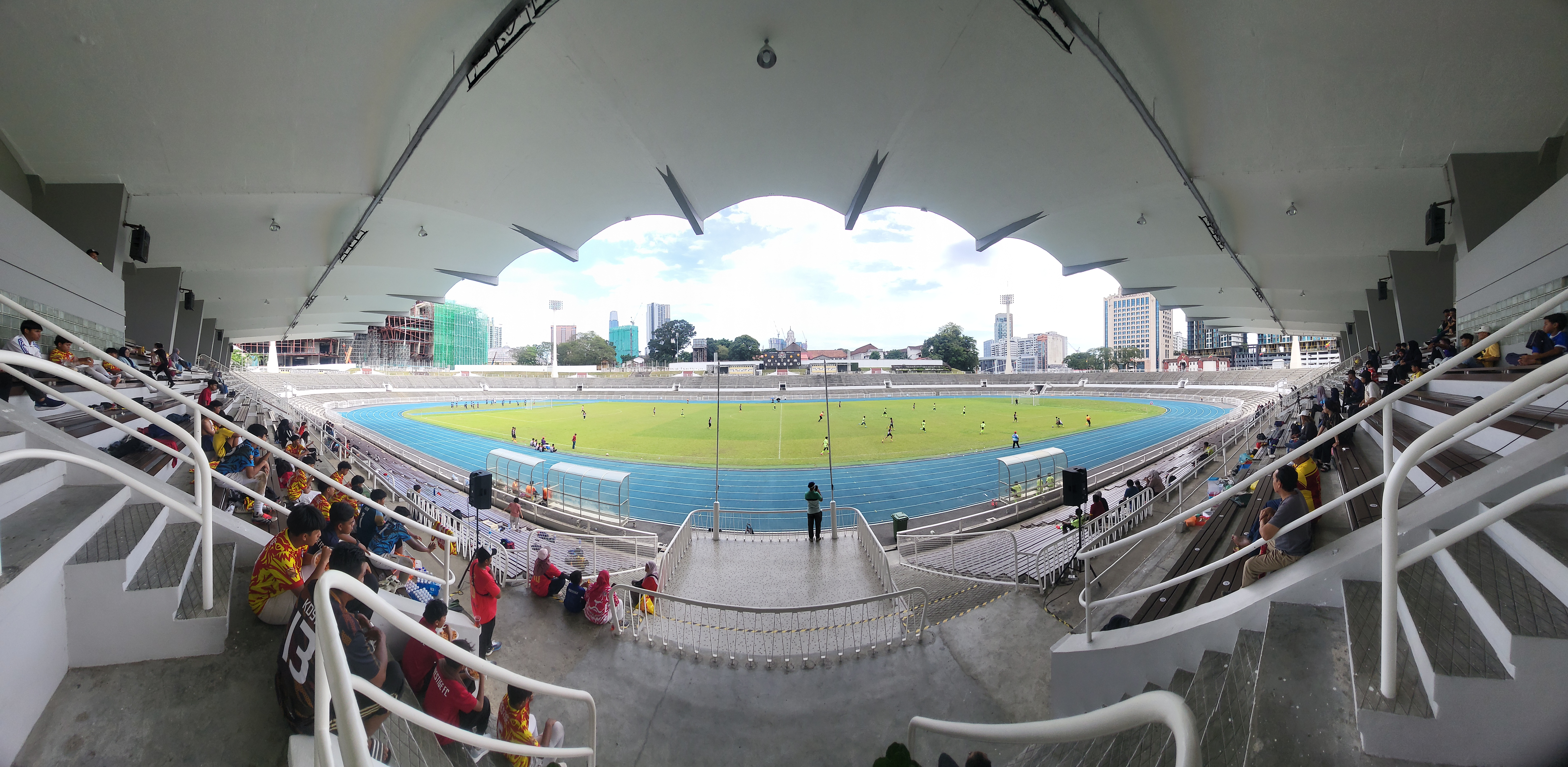
Panoramic view.

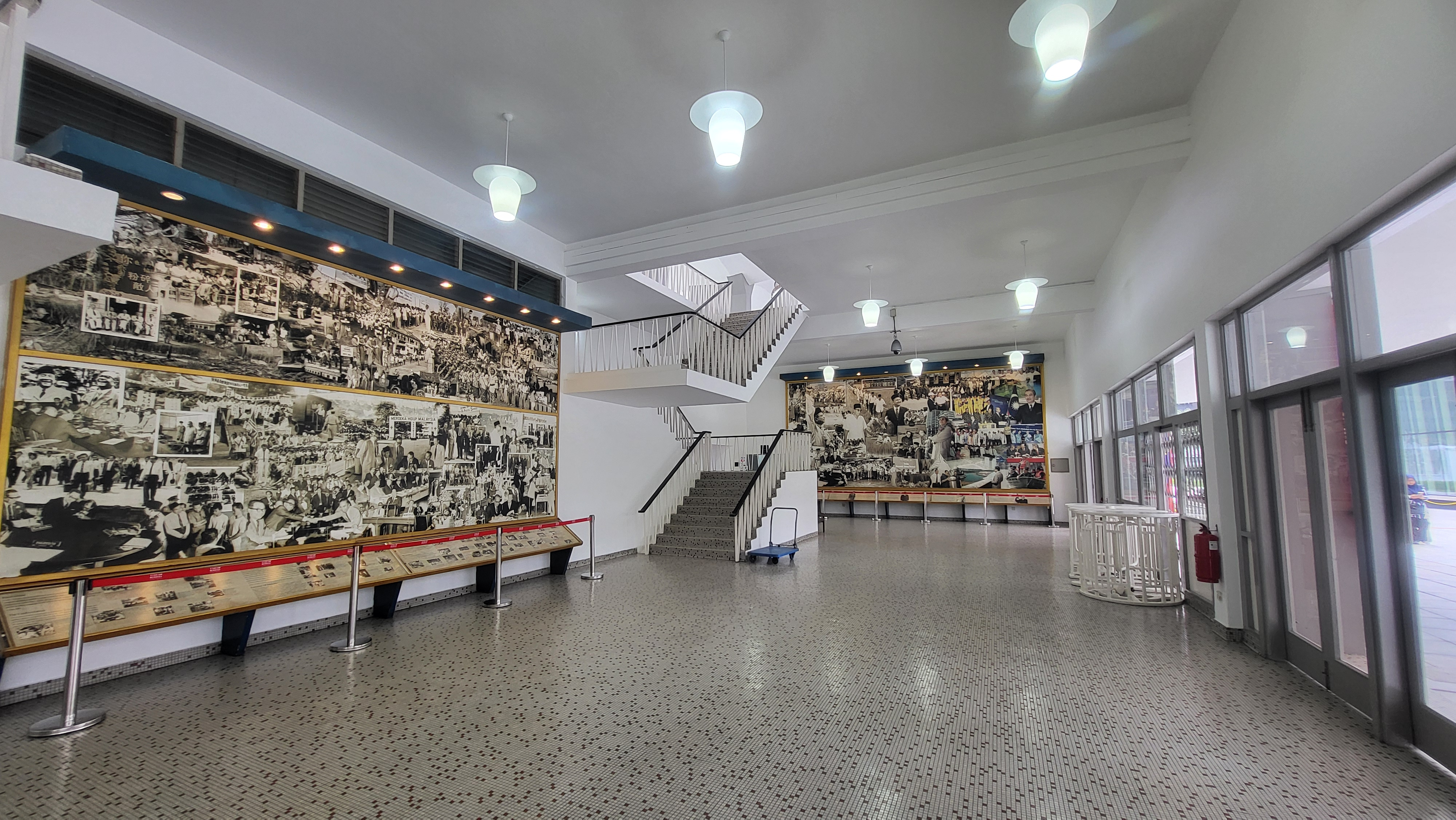
Interior.

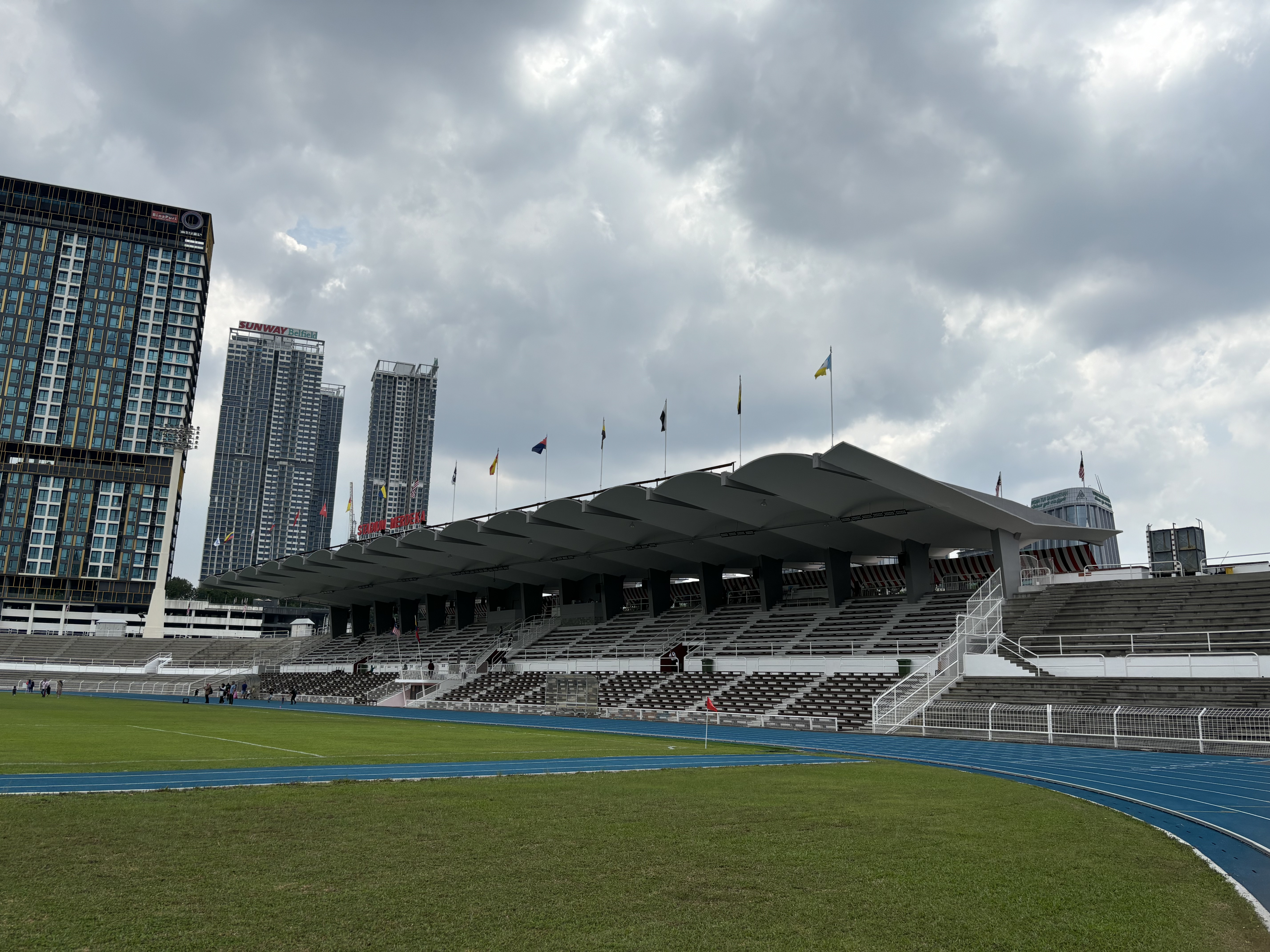
Grandstand.

=== Before refurbishment ===
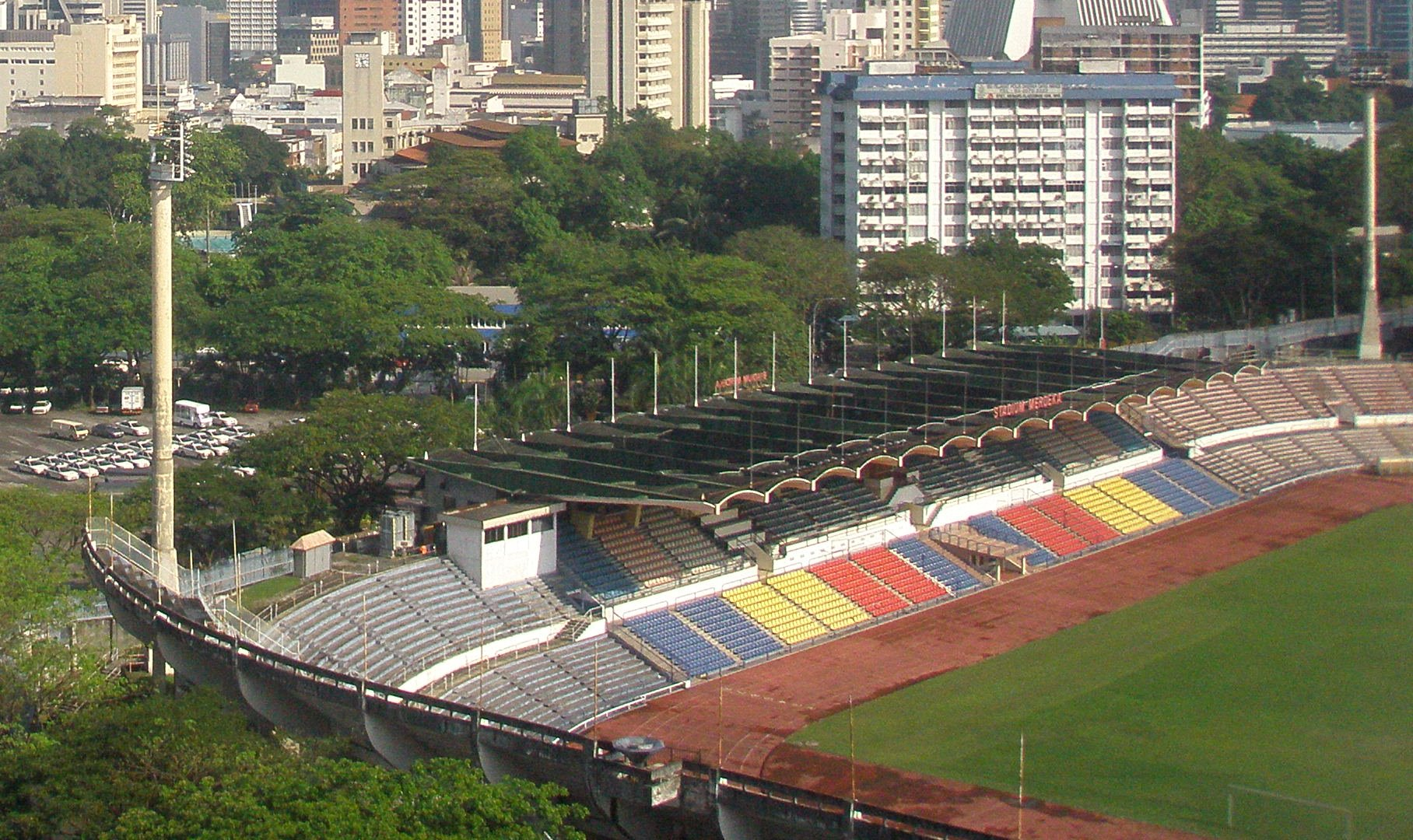
Originally only the lower stands were built but in later years the upper stands were added.

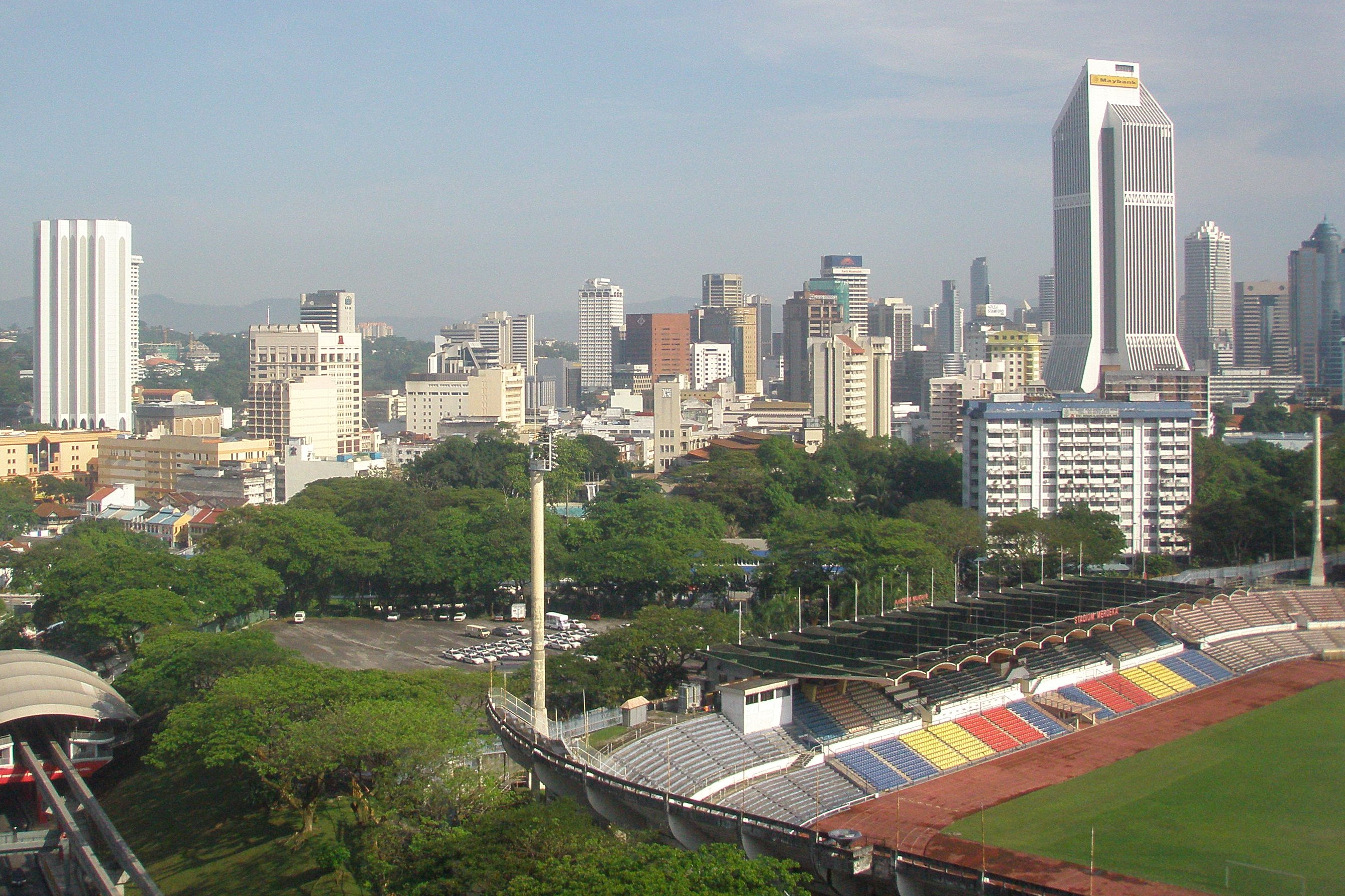
A splendid view of Kuala Lumpur with Independence Stadium to the right in 2007.

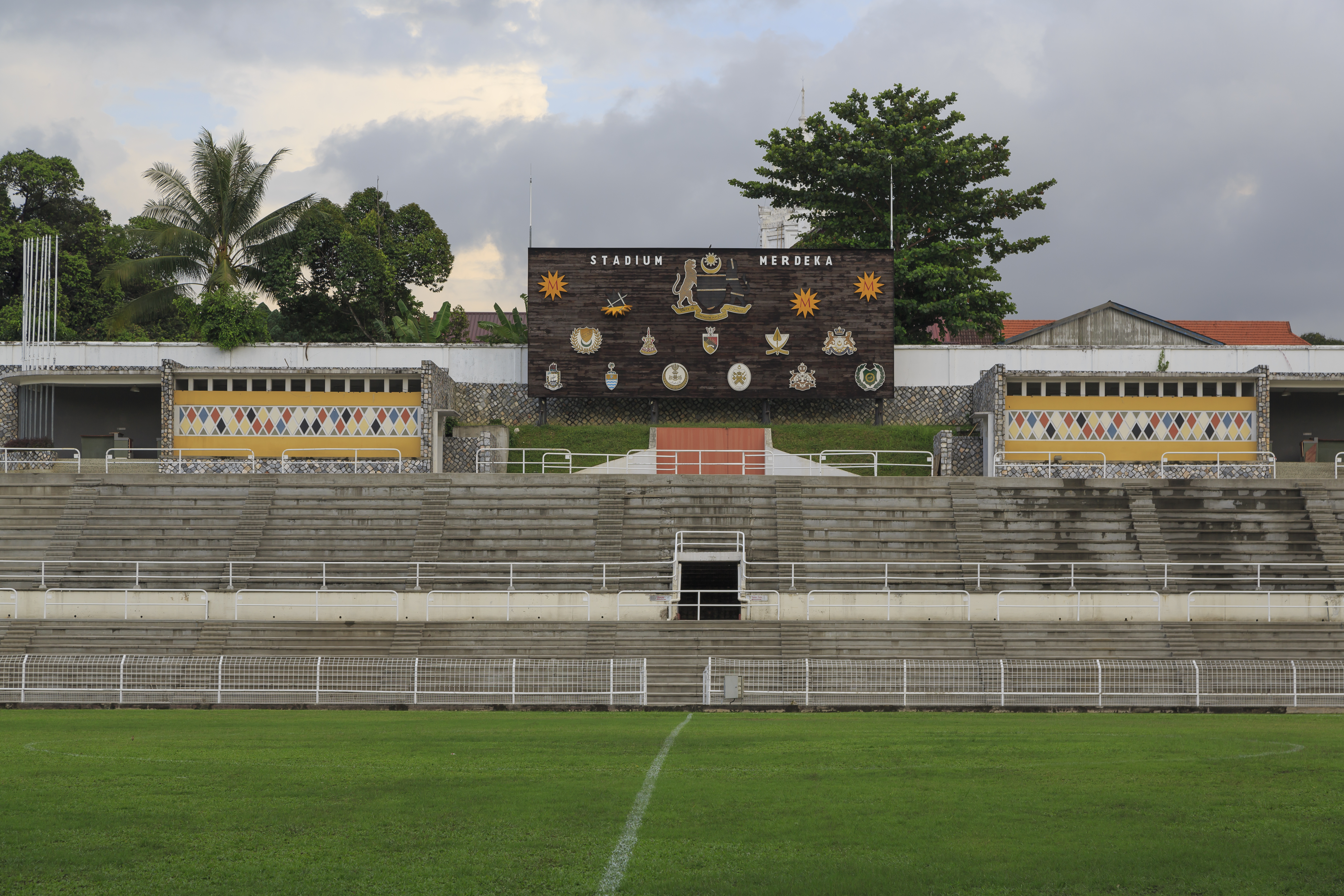
View of the east stand of the stadium.

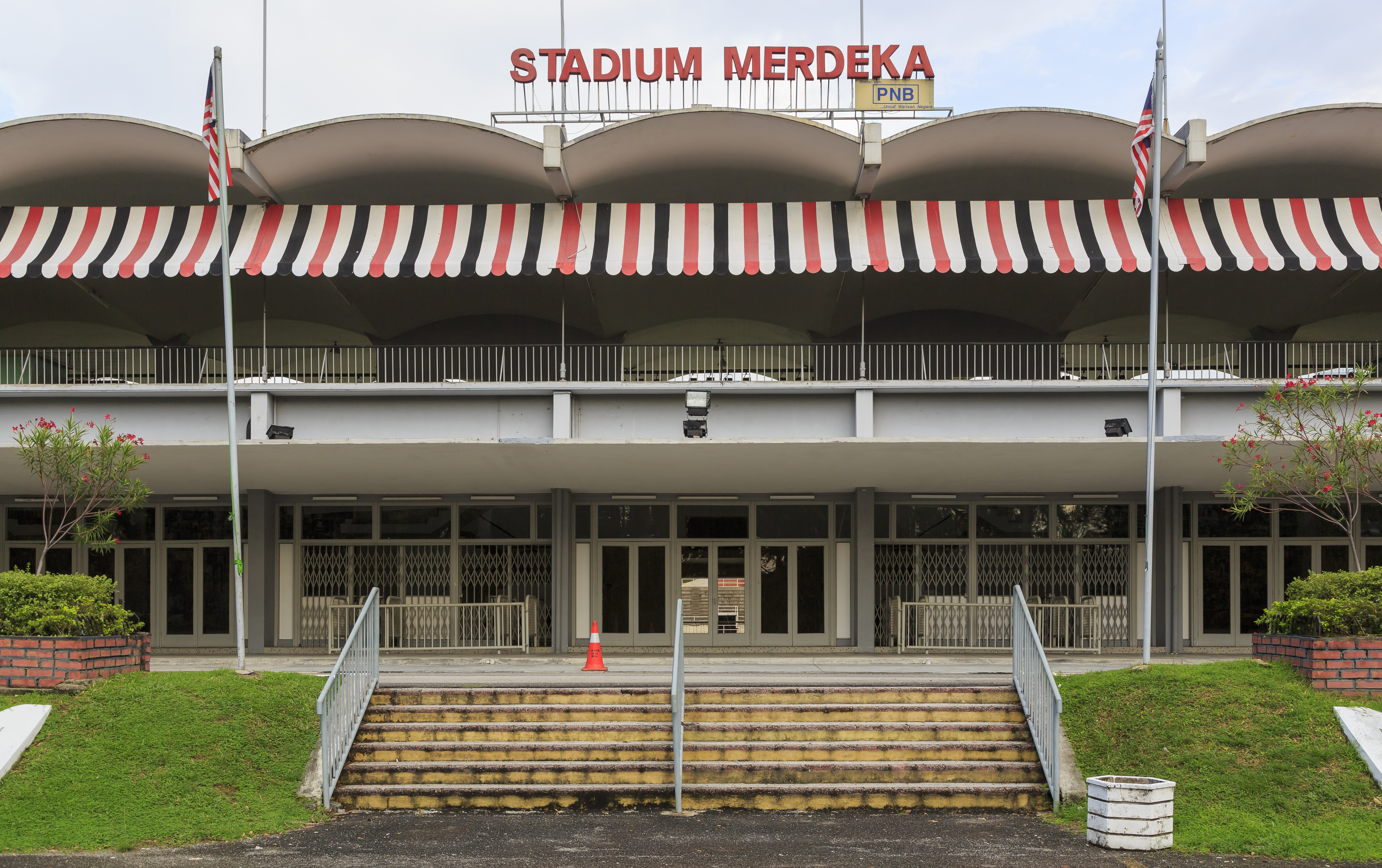
View of the stadium from its entrance.

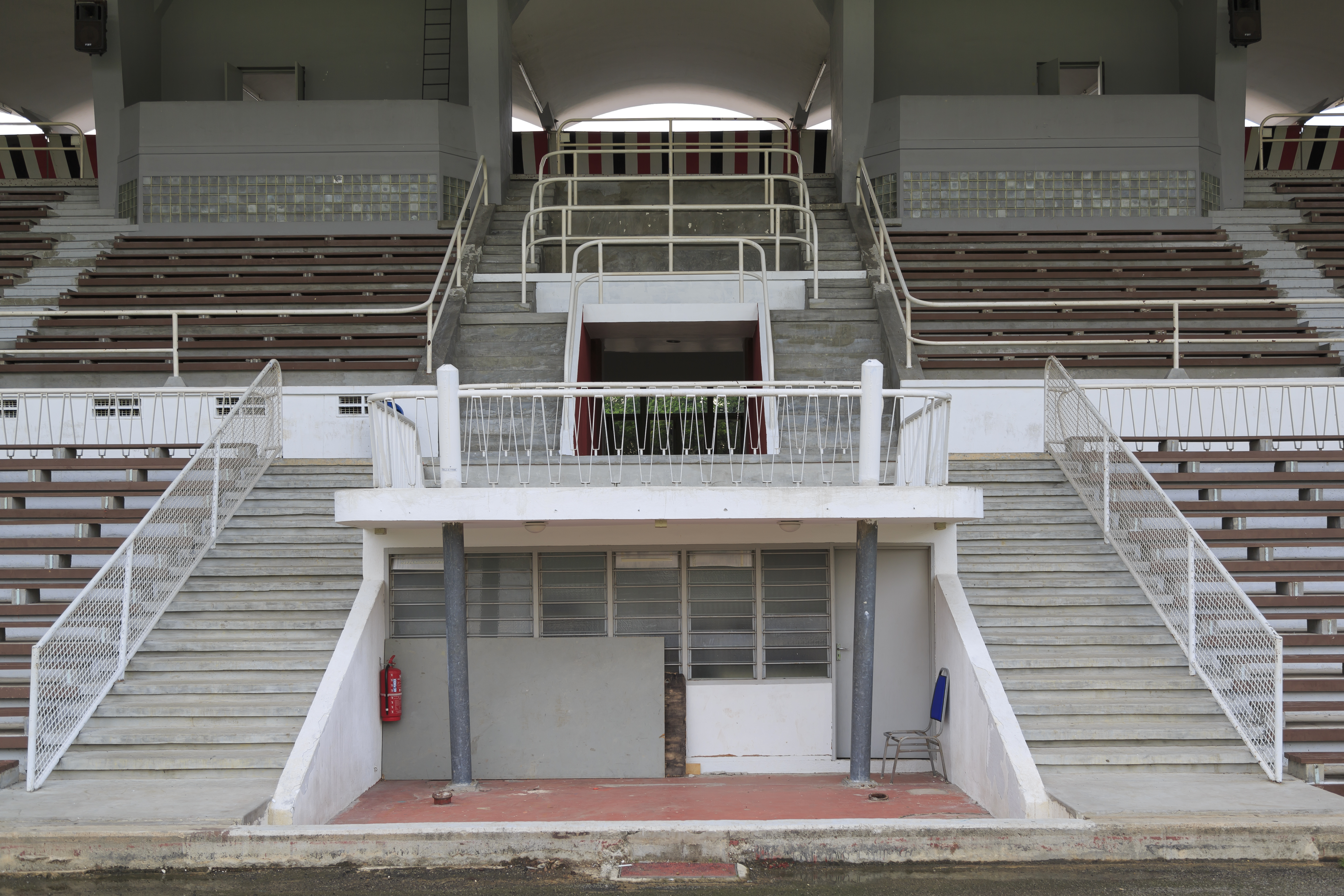
View of the covered stand of the stadium.

== See also ==
- Merdeka 118
- Merdeka 118 Precinct
- Stadium Negara
- Stanley Edward Jewkes
- National Stadium
- List of stadiums in Malaysia
- Malayan Declaration of Independence

== Sources ==
- Lai, Chee Kien (2018). The Merdeka interviews: architects, engineers and artists of Malaysia's Independence. Pertubuhan Akitek Malaysia. ISBN 978-967-5264-20-7. OCLC 1042278335.
- Mohd Bakri Jaffar. Azmy Morsidi (2007). Untukmu Malaysia : sempena 50 tahun merdeka : 25,000 kilometer : menjejaki warisan kita : himpunan gezet monumen dan bangunan bersejarah. Ultimate Print. ISBN 978-983-43540-0-8. OCLC 762101071.
- Haji Nawang, Adnan (1999). Stadium Merdeka & Stadium Negara meniti sejarah kegemilangan. Utusan Publications & Distributors. ISBN 967-61-0902-9. OCLC 769049252.
