= Stanley Edward Jewkes =

American architect (1913–2011)

Stanley Edward Jewkes (1913–2011) was an American architect as well as an engineer. He was a key figure in Southeast Asian post-independence architecture. His close relationship with Malaysia's then Prime Minister Tunku Abdul Rahman led to his getting several prominent architectural commissions in Malaysia including for Stadium Merdeka and Stadium Negara. He practiced in Malaysia from 1941 until 1962. He then continued to work in the United States for a multi-national architectural and engineering practice.

== Early life ==
Jewkes was born in the United States on the 9th of October, 1913. After World War I, he and his parents travelled to Birmingham and there, he won a scholarship to study at Dudley Grammar School. At Northampton Institute and the London Polytechnic, he studied architecture and engineering before being hired as the chief engineer of British Steel Construction. He was associated with both the Royal Institute of British Architects (RIBA) as well as the Institute of Civil Engineers in London.

In 1941, Jewkes came to Malaysia to join the Public Works Department (PWD). He served first in the districts of Krian and Keroh. He was then asked to become the head of the new Design and Research Branch. Subsequently, Jewkes became the Director of the Public Works Department from 1959 to 1962. Soon after coming to Malaysia, war broke out in the peninsula and he was made a lieutenant in the Federated Malay States Volunteer Force. In 2001, he compiled and published his philosophical rumination about his life in relation to his own encounters in a book named “Humankind: Planet Earth’s Most Enigmatic Species”.

At 98 years of age, Jewkes died peacefully at the Mission Oaks Hospice in Oxford, Florida on the 19th of June, 2011. He left behind his wife Ella, and their two children, Carole and Peter.

== Buildings ==
Of the many buildings that he had designed and/or engineered, his most famous works are located at the Petaling Hill.

- Merdeka Park
- Stadium Merdeka
- Stadium Negara

== Contributions ==
With his help, he made sure that the PWD’s engineering department capabilities were on par with most developed nations in the world. He also reworked and clarified traffic circulations around the city, as well as supervised the construction of Klang Gates Dam for KL’s water supply. He even determined the site of the dam after extensive surveys. At the same time of being the Director of the PWD, Jewkes managed to find time to teach Advanced Engineering at the KL Technical College. He guided a whole generation of local engineers at PWD who would take over after his retirement from Malaysia. He was even responsible for the awarding of overseas engineering scholarships based on meritocracy rather than on race.

As for his buildings, the Stadium Merdeka won an award given by the Badan Warisan Malaysia for having the tallest prestressed structure in the world during that time with the 140 feet tall lighting towers, as well as having one of the longest cantilevered shell roofs in the world.

== Honour ==
=== Foreign honour ===
- Malaya :
  - Honorary Commander of the Order of the Defender of the Realm ((P.M.N. (K)) - Tan Sri (1962)
