= People's Uprising rally =

2013 protest in Kuala Lumpur, Malaysia

People's Uprising Rally, 2013
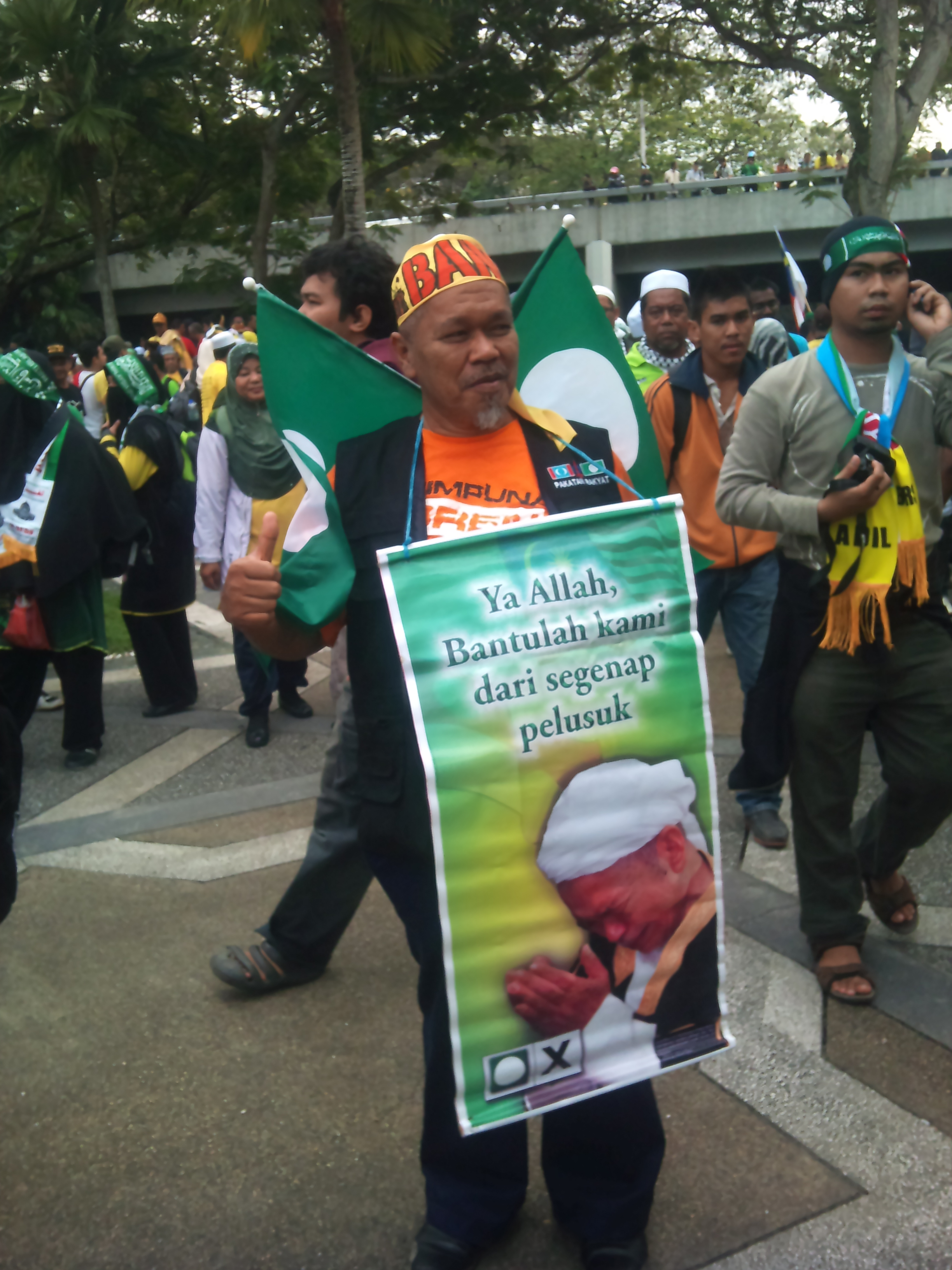
- Supporter of opposition leader Nik Aziz Nik Mat of PAS.
- Date: 12 January 2013
- Location: Kuala Lumpur, Malaysia

Parties
Opposition members	Government of Malaysia

Number
100,000 to 150,000 people	

The People's Uprising rally or Himpunan Kebangkitan Rakyat (Malay) was a rally that was held in Kuala Lumpur, Malaysia on 12 January 2013. The rally was held by various Malaysian opposition-friendly non-governmental organisations and opposition parties in opposition to many of the government policies and decisions that have been claimed by left-wing supporters to be unfair and affecting the Malaysian populace. The main venue that the organisers have chosen for the rally is Stadium Merdeka. The event was also known as the KL 112 rally, where the numbers indicate the date of the event.

== Background ==
According to social activist and icon Hishamuddin Rais, the grievances against the government were many and varied[1] The following lists of grouses:

- The scrapping of the rare-earth refinery run by Lynas in Kuantan, Pahang.
- To fight against cheating in the general elections by the Malaysian government.
- The fair distribution of oil-royalty payments by the Malaysian government to oil-producing states.
- Free education for all Malaysians.

The election watchdog group Bersih which organised several rallies calling for electoral reform in Malaysia namely the rallies in Bersih rallies in 2011 and 2012 had revealed that it was not amongst the organisers of the latest rally but has said that many of its members will be attending the rally on their own capacity.

The opposition coalition Pakatan Rakyat has made a 10-point declaration:

- Free and fair elections
- Saving Felda
- Restoring the rights of Sabah and Sarawak
- Increasing the oil royalty to petroleum-producing states to 20%
- Safeguarding the future of the civil servants
- A clean and healthy environment
- Strengthening the national language and mother tongues
- Freeing of all political detainees
- Preserving Malaysia's national heritage
- Better living standards for women

== Lead up to the rally ==
=== Government and police measures ===
The police had advised the organisers of the rally to hold the rally in Bukit Jalil stadium instead of having it in Stadium Merdeka. In anticipation of the protests, the government began the closure of Dataran Merdeka to prevent protesters from gathering at that location. The government had also warned against civil servants from attending the rally. Various public universities in Malaysia echoed the government's warning telling students and teachers not to attend the rally. The government-controlled mainstream media gave scanted coverage of the rally.

=== Chronology ===
This is the chronology of the people's uprising rally 2013 (KL112) that was held in Stadium Merdeka, Kuala Lumpur, Saturday 12 January 2013.

- 10.05 morning: Participant set out to Universiti Malaya (UM) while holding hands.
- 10.05 morning: PAS Security Wing was patrolling Sultan Road.
- 10.20 morning: The participant entered the Federal Highway Kuala Lumpur.
- 10.35 morning: Amcorp Mall protesters met with protesters in Universiti Malaya.
- 11.25 morning: PKR Vice-president, Fuziah Salleh arrived on Sultan Road.
- 11.14, morning: A group of protesters passed by the Maybank Building in Bangsar.
- 12.02 mid-day: The protesters in Sultan Road sang together the traditional song "Rasa Sayang"
- 12.08 mid-day: The Green Rally President, Wong Tack gave his speech to protesters on Sultan Road.
- 12.10 mid-day: Unit Amal PAS (PAS Security Body) was waiting in Little India, Brickfields to combine with protesters that came from Amcorp Mall before going to Stadium Merdeka.
- 12.15 mid-day: Dr Tan Seng Giaw Kepong MP arrived at Sultan Road.
- 12.45 mid-day: Opposition leaders and non-governmental organisation leaders gave speeches in front of spectators before moving on to the Stadium Merdeka.
- 12.52 mid-day: The participant of PUR 2013 moved up to the Stadium Merdeka.
- 1.00 pm: Participants were asked by the opposition to sit on the roadside near the Basket Ball Stadium.
- 1.14 pm: Fuziah Salleh gave a speech in front of spectators in the National Basket Ball Stadium. In her speech, she said, the rally was organised to uphold the agenda of the opposition.
- 1.17 pm: Participants from Sultan Road continued their way to the Stadium Merdeka.
- 1.24 pm: Some of the Muslim participants were seen to be doing their Zuhr prayers. The sounds of the Vuvuzela filled the stadium.
- The event started with the singing of Negaraku.
- 1.51 pm: 40,000 participants entered Stadium Merdeka. PAS Vice-president giving his speech.
- 2.03 pm: Safwan Anang student activist gave his speech. He stated that all students should use everything in their power to abolish PTPTN loans and University and College Act 1971 be repelled by the government.
- 2.07 pm: The arrival of Menteri Besar Selangor, Tan Sri Abdul Khalid Ibrahim.
- 2.11 pm: PAS President, Datuk Seri Abdul Hadi Awang and PAS Secretary, Datuk Mustafa Ali arrived at Stadium Merdeka.
- 2.38 pm: Arrival of the Opposition Leader, Datuk Seri Anwar Ibrahim Stadium Merdeka.
- 2.45 pm: DAP Chairman, Karpal Singh; DAP Secretary, Lim Guan Eng dan DAP Adviser, Lim Kit Siang arrived at the stadium.
- 3.06 pm: Blues Gang vocalist, Ito sang the anthem of the rally 'Ubah Sekarang'.
- 3.13 pm: National Laureate Datuk A. Samad Said recited the poem titled 'Di Atas Padang Sejarah' or 'On The Field Of History'.
- 3.35 pm: DAP Secretary, Lim Guan Eng gave his speech.
- 4.15 pm: The Opposition Leader, Datuk Seri Anwar Ibrahim gave his speech. Anwar ended his speech, by shouting "Merdeka" 7 times in a row. The crowd ensues.
- 4.40 pm: The declaration of the rally by Datuk Saifuddin Nasution Ismail.
- 4.45 pm: Recitation of the Muslim prayer by PAS Spiritual Advisor Nik Abdul Aziz Nik Mat.
- 4.50 pm: The rally ended with the singing of the National Anthem Negaraku.

=== Non-governmental organisations ===
The Malaysian human rights watchdog SUHAKAM and the Malaysian Bar Council will be monitoring the rally. The Bar Council will be sending in a team of lawyers to anyone who needs legal assistance should they be arrested by the police. Former Bar Council president K Ragunath criticised the Bar Council for showing a tendency to support the opposition.

== Protests ==
There were fears by a Malaysian NGO Solidariti Anak Muda Malaysia (SAMM) that there would be some provocations by the police during the demonstration. After the rally ended, the PDRM or the Malaysian Royal Police was praised as they showed a tremendous amount of patience and restraint.

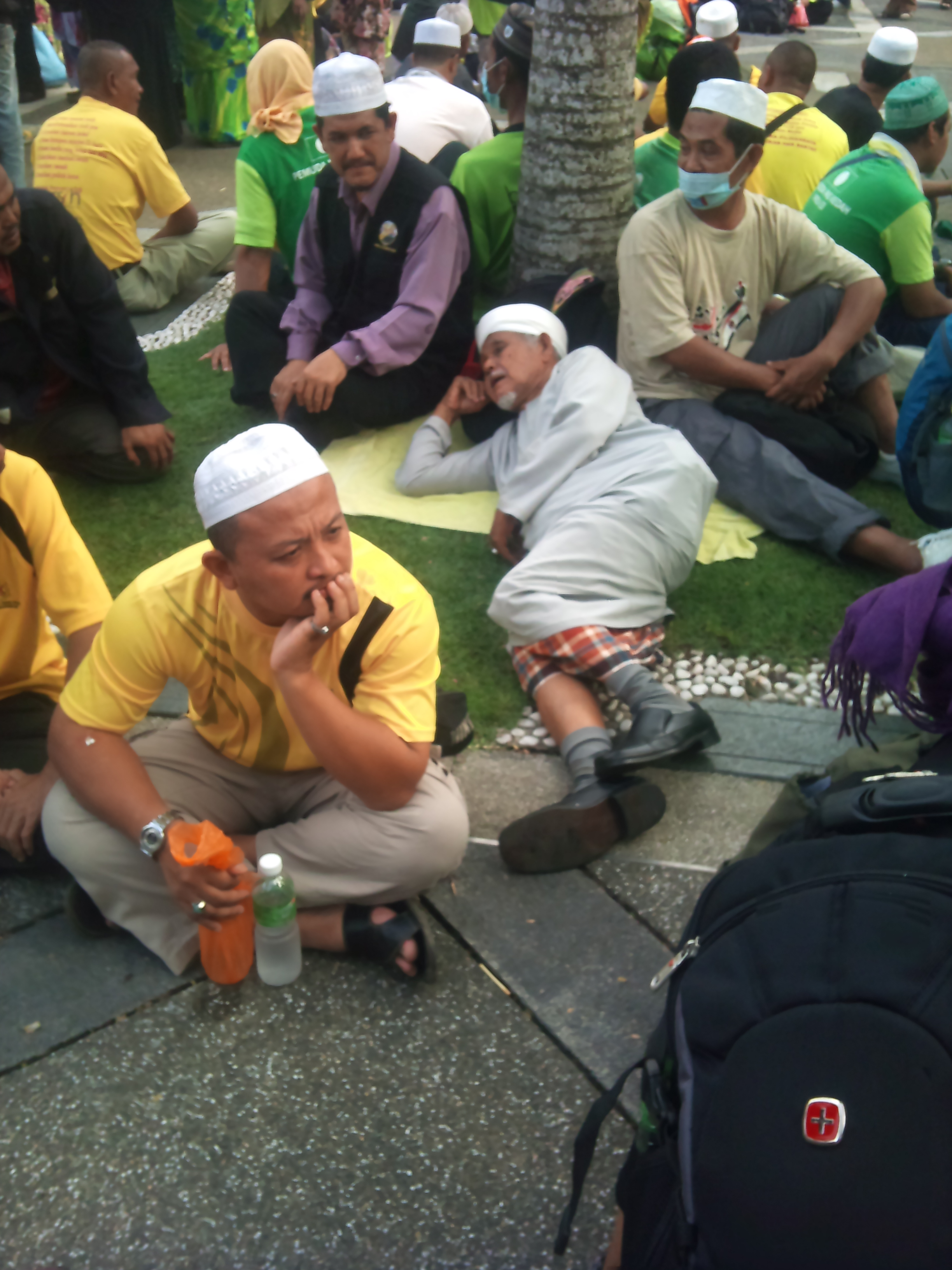
Participants taking a rest.

According to different estimates, there were about 100,000 to 150,000 people who attended the rally, which was quite peaceful compared to the previous rallies. Many of the rallygoers gathered at various points of the city before making their way to Stadium Merdeka where the rally organisers conducted several speeches in support of their ideals.

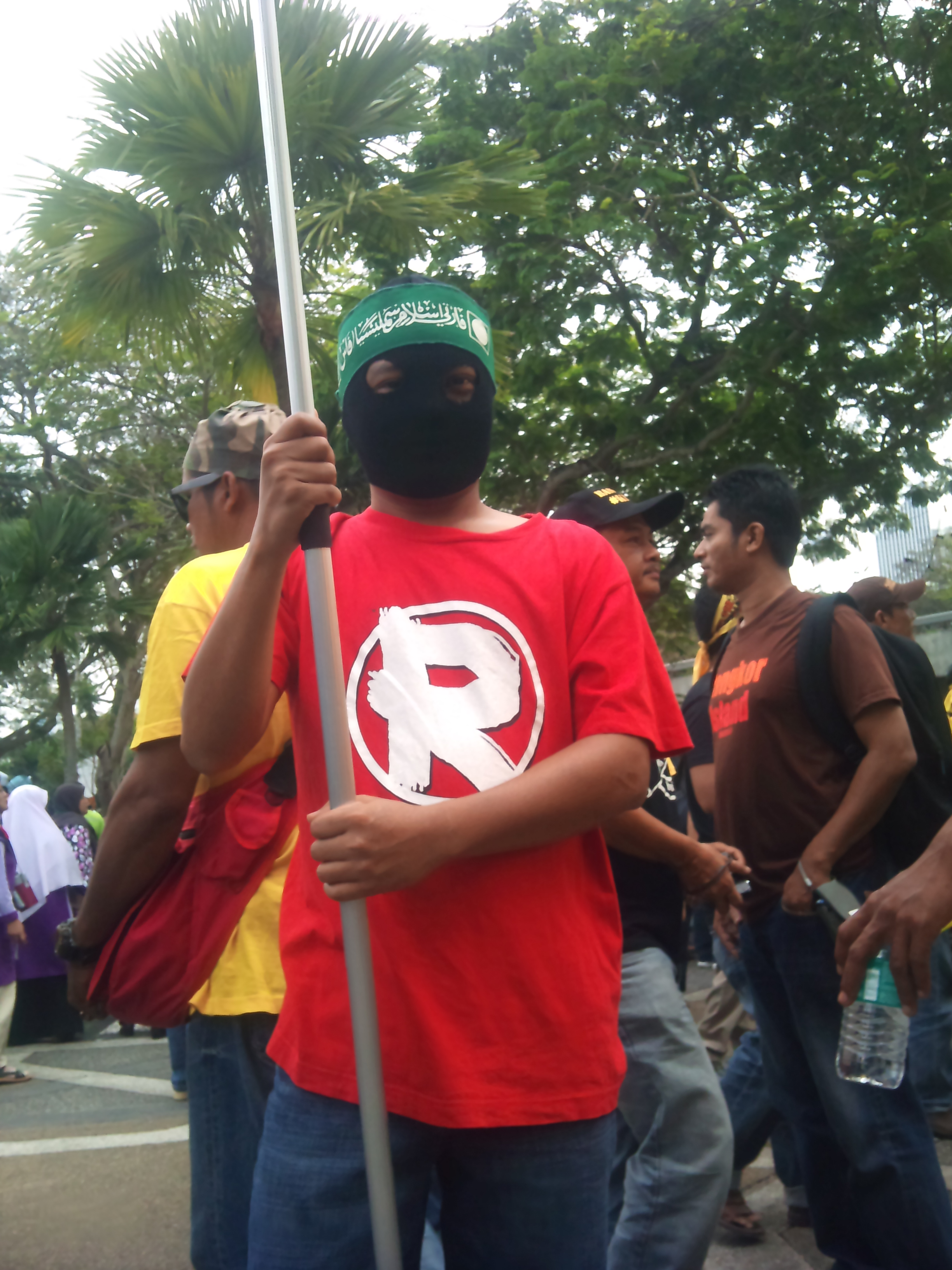
A rally participant.

== Aftermath ==
The police were commended for the way they handled the rally by both governments as well as opposition leaders and the general public.

== See also ==
- List of protests in the 21st century
