= Stadium Negara =

Indoor arena in Kuala Lumpur, Malaysia

Coordinates: 3°8′26″N 101°42′10″E

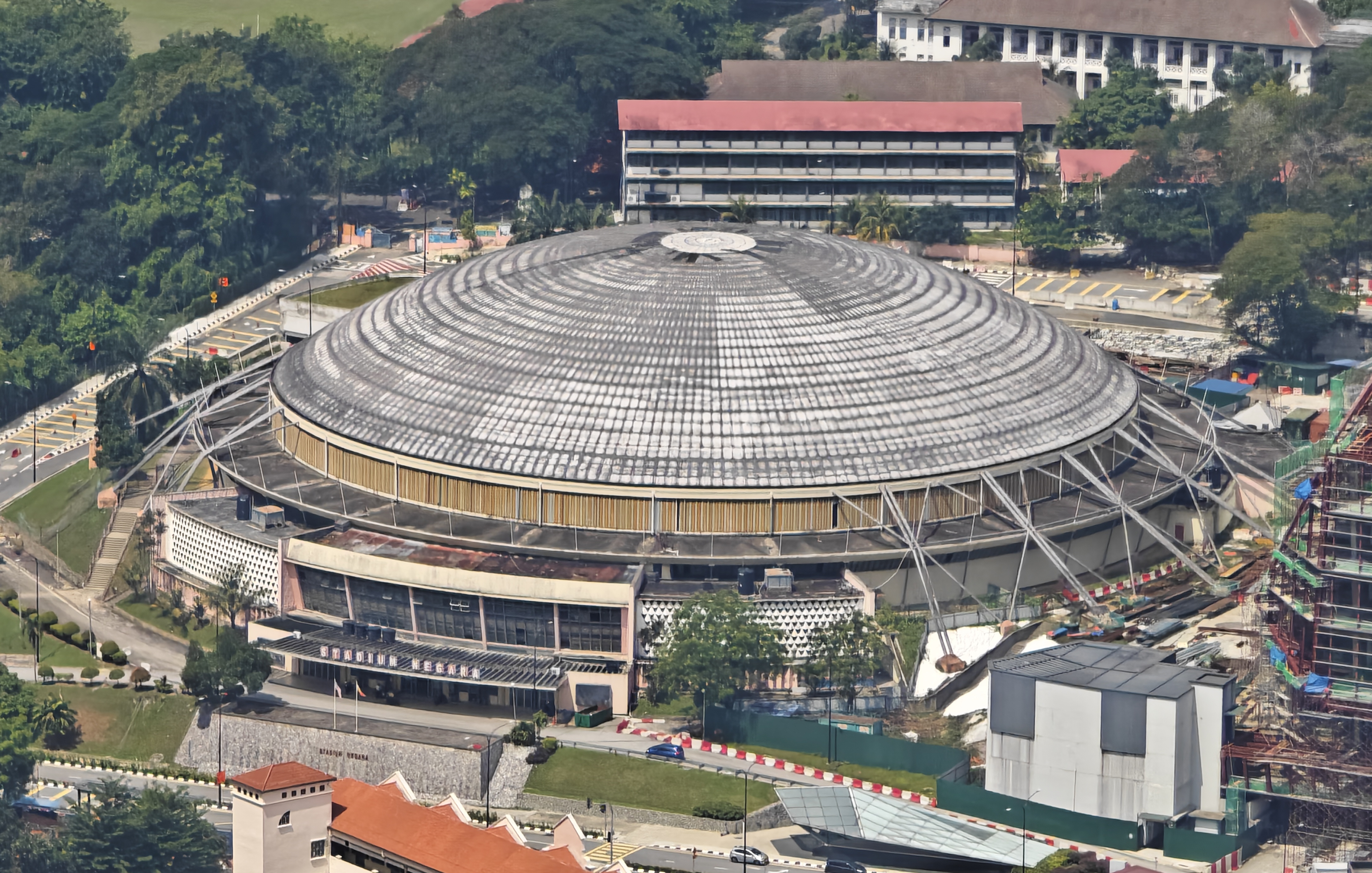
- Exterior view of Stadium Negara in 2024
- Interactive map of Stadium Negara
- Address: Jalan Hang Jebat; 50150, Kuala Lumpur, Malaysia
- Owner: PNB Merdeka Ventures Sdn. Bhd.
- Capacity: 10,000
- Public transit: KG17 Merdeka; MR3 Maharajalela; AG8 SP8 Plaza Rakyat via KG17 Merdeka

Construction
- Groundbreaking: 1960
- Opened: 19 April 1962
- Renovated: 1982; 1985; 2015
- Cost: RM34 million
- Project manager: Stanley Edward Jewkes
- Structural engineers: Ng Eng Hean; W.J. Cumming
- General contractors: M. D. Canavan; Koon Yew Yin; S. Nakendra

Nation Stadium is an indoor arena located in Kuala Lumpur, Malaysia.

== Background ==
Nation Stadium is located about 2 kilometers from Kuala Lumpur City Centre, next to the Independence Stadium and Merdeka 118 building.

The stadium, which has 10,000 permanent seats, is fully air conditioned and is capable of housing many different types of events, including sports events and concerts.

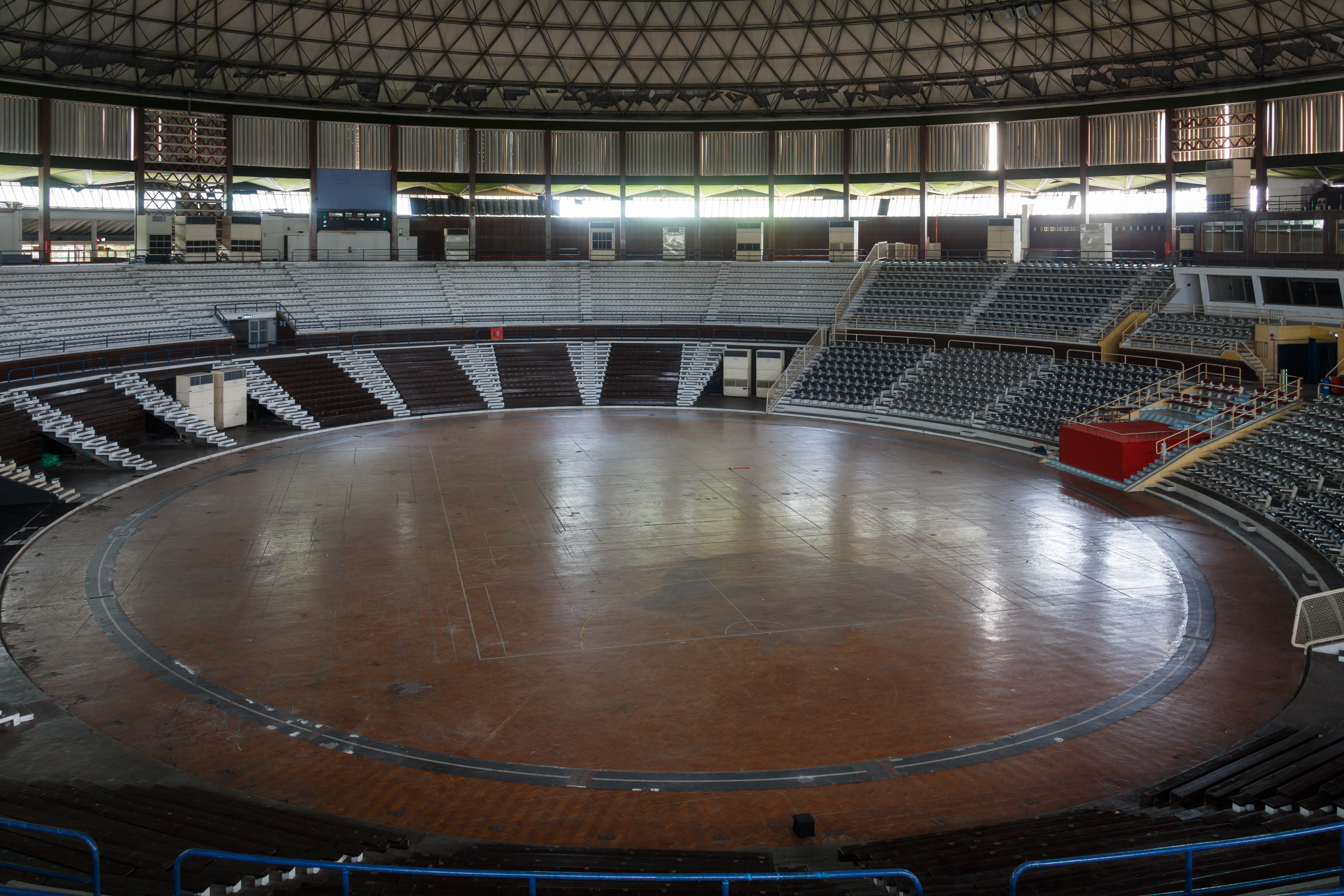
Arena bowl, 2014

=== Facilities ===
- VIP Holding room
- Media Centre
- Sport Facilities
- Existing Ticketing Booths
- In-house provide Air-conditioning

== History ==
The construction of the stadium began in 1960 and it was officially opened on 10 April 1962 by the third Yang di-Pertuan Agong, Tuanku Syed Putra. It was the first indoor stadium in Malaysia.

The stadium has been renovated thrice, in 1982, 1985 and 2015.

For most major indoor events in Kuala Lumpur, the Stadium Negara has largely been supplanted in use by the Axiata Arena (in terms of modernity and capacity).

== Major events ==
- Miss World Malaysia – 20 April 1963 until 1973
- The Bee Gees – 1972 Stadium Negara
- Santana – Caravanserai Tour – 19 July 1973
- Gillan – 2 August 1982. It is said to have been the first hard rock and heavy metal concert in Malaysia.
- Tina Turner, Break Every Rule World Tour – 24–25 February 1988
- Eric Clapton – 26 November 1990
- Asian Taekwondo Championships – 31 January 1992
- Kylie Minogue, Rhythm of Love Tour – 3 March 1991
- Gloria Estefan, Into the Light World Tour – November 1991
- Paula Abdul, Under My Spell Tour – 22 February 1992
- Rothmans, Thomas Cup/Uber Cup and Malaysia – 1992
- Holiday on Ice – November 1992
- Sting – 2 February 1994
- Cliff Richard, The Hit List Tour – 9 January 1995
- Bon Jovi, These Days Tour – 4 May 1995
- Faye Wong Live in Concert – 9–10 November 1995
- Def Leppard, Slang World Tour – 4 June 1996
- Slam: Konsert Grand Slam Unplugged – 3 August 1996
- Sarah Brightman, Harem World Tour – 20 June 2004
- INXS, Switch Tour – 18 August 2006
- Muse, Black Holes and Revelations Tour – 25 February 2007
- TVXQ – 24 November 2007
- Kanye West – 2007
- Jason Mraz – 2009
- Disney on Ice
- JYJ – 17 October 2010
- Digi Live KPOP Party 2011 – 13 January 2011
- Incubus – 23 July 2011
- David Archuleta – 26 July 2011
- 2PM – 25 November 2011
- F.T. Island – 14 January 2012
- The Cranberries – 4 April 2012
- Sum 41, Does This Look Infected?: 10th Anniversary Tour – 14 April 2012
- Sandy Lam MMXII Concert – 28 July 2012
- Wonder Girls – 13 October 2012
- Jonas Brothers, Jonas Brothers World Tour – 24 October 2012
- The Jacksons, Unity Tour – 13 December 2012
- Paramore, The Self-Titled Tour – 17 February 2013
- CNBLUE: Blue Moon World Tour – 24 August 2013
- Infinite, One Great Step – 19 October 2013
- 2NE1: All or Nothing World Tour – 24 May 2014
- CNBLUE: Can't Stop Concert – 9 August 2014
- SIIMA Awards: 3rd South Indian International Movie Awards – 12–13 September 2014
- Pet Shop Boys: Electric Tour – 24 September 2014
- Running Man: Race Start! Running Man Fan Meeting Asia Tour Season 2 – 1 November 2014
- Taeyang Rise World Tour – 8 February 2015
- Backstreet Boys, In a World Like This Tour – 3 May 2015
- Pentatonix, On My Way Home Tour – 30 May 2015
- Dato' Siti Nurhaliza & Friends Concert – 2 April 2016
- iKon: iKoncert 2016: Showtime Tour – 13 August 2016
- Megadeth Dystopia World Tour – April 2017
- Seventeen Seventeen 1st World Tour "Diamond Edge" – 9 September 2017
- Wanna One Wanna One 1st Fan Meeting in Kuala Lumpur "Wanna Be Loved" – 19 January 2018

== Gallery ==
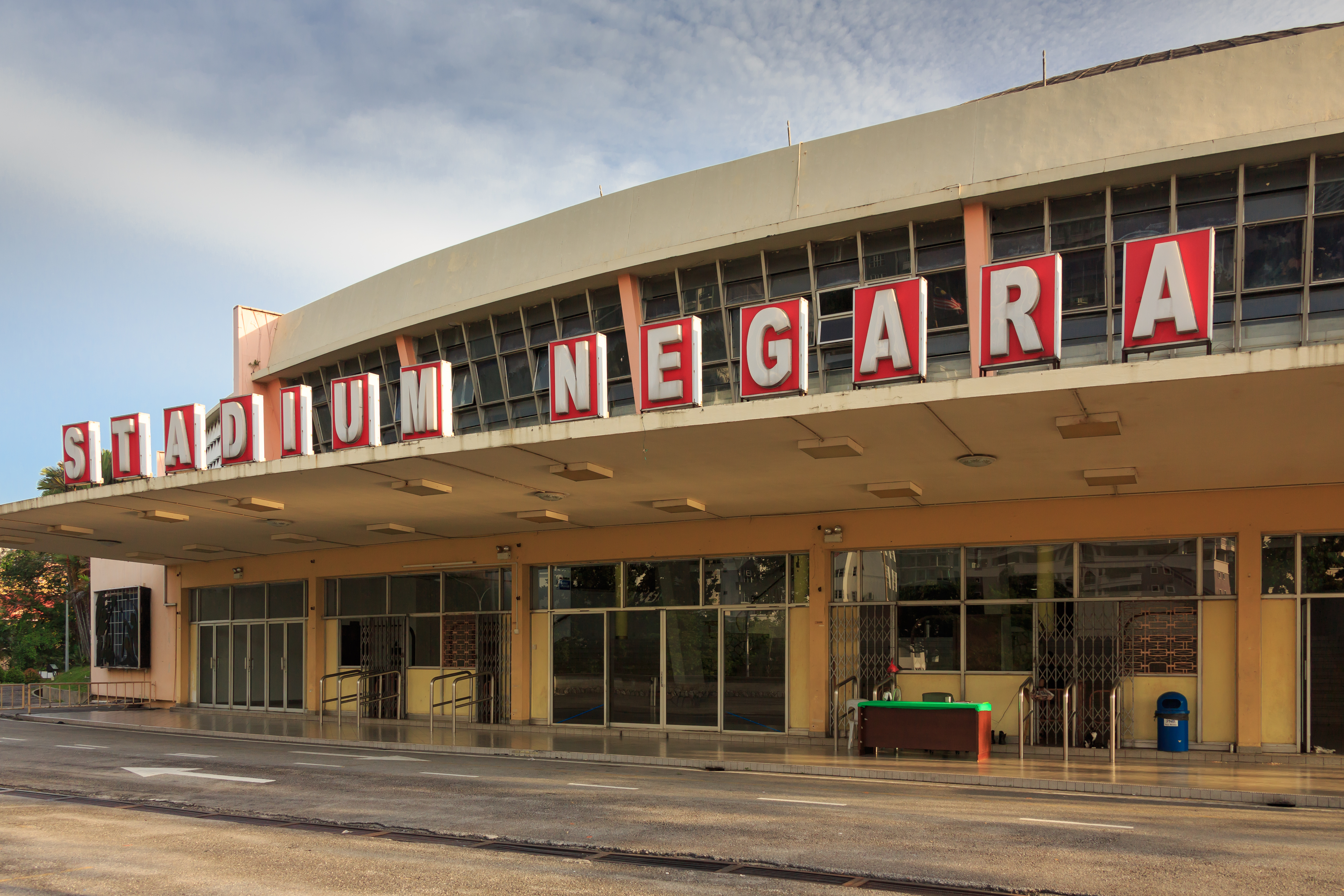
Front entrance of Stadium Negara in 2014

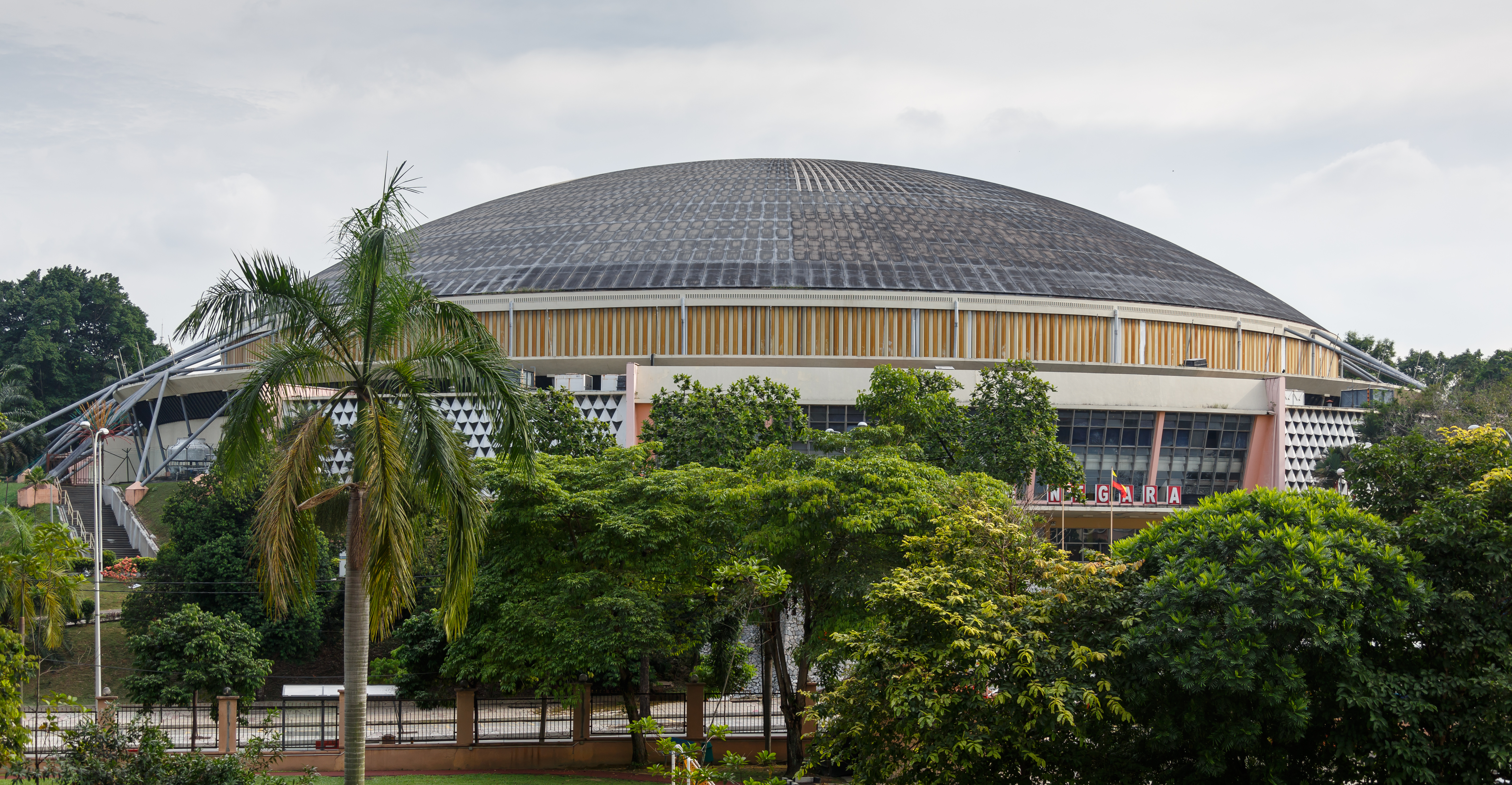
View from the front of Stadium Negara in 2014

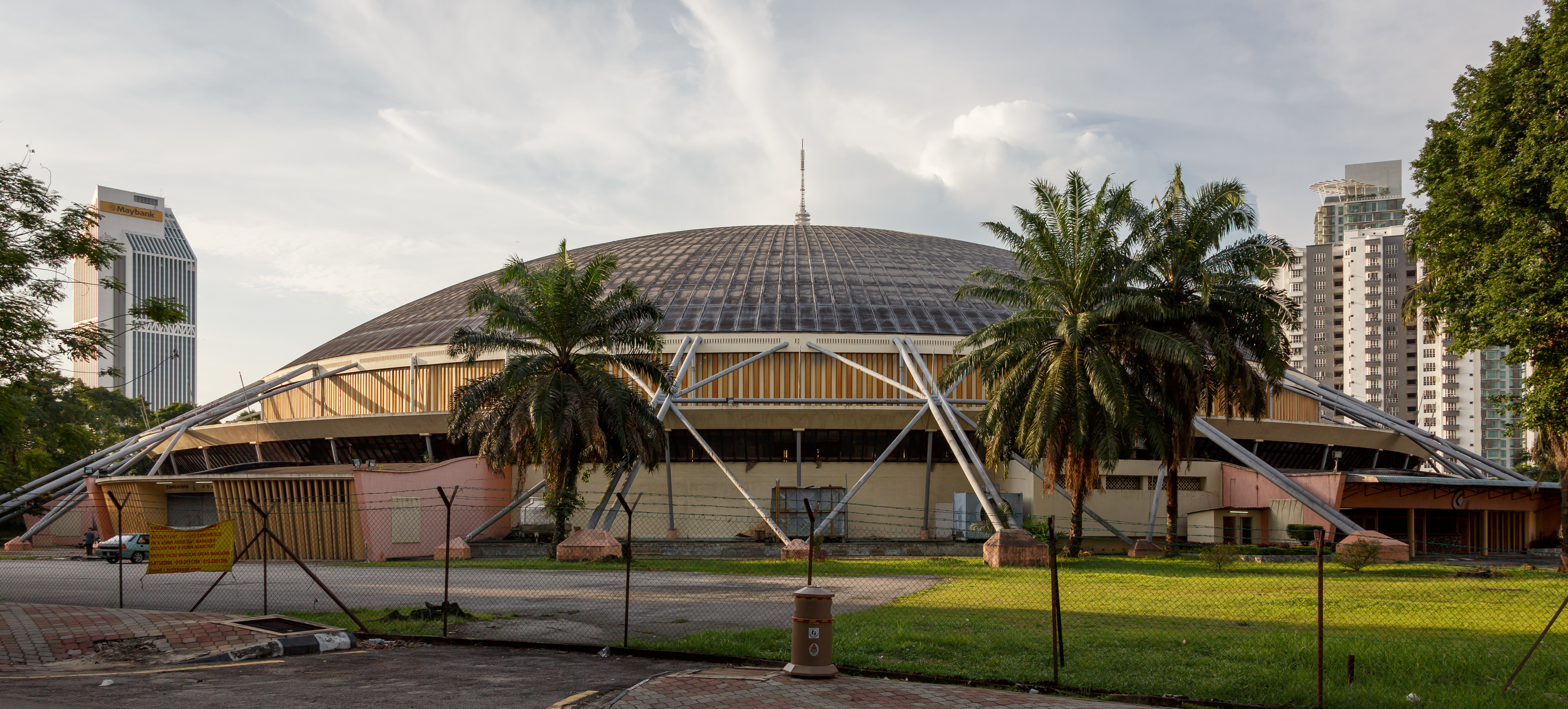
View from the back of Stadium Negara in 2014

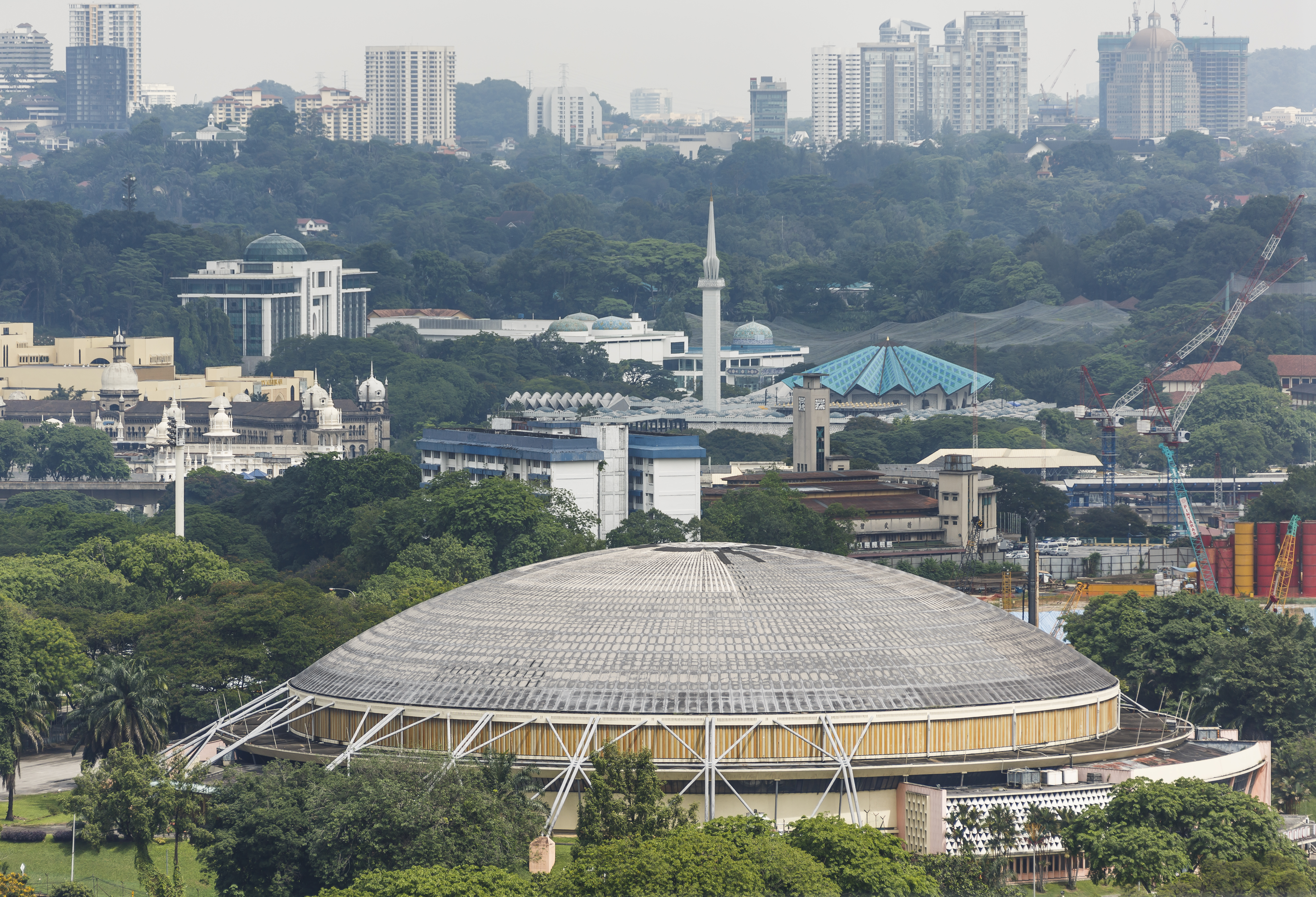
Top view of Stadium Negara in 2014

== See also ==
- Merdeka 118 Precinct
- Sport in Malaysia
