= Vitaliy Raskalov and Vadim Makhorov =

Photographers

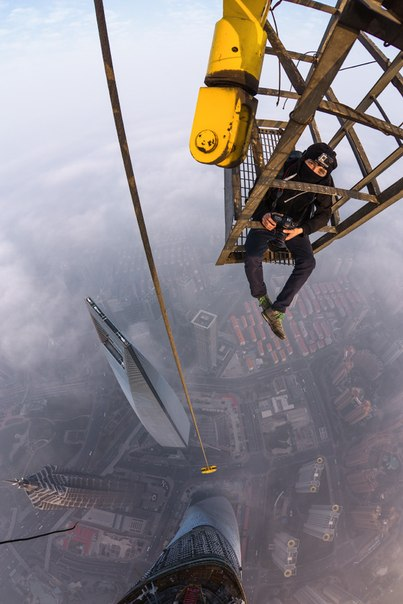
- One of their members on the Shanghai Tower in 2014

YouTube information
- Channel: On The Roofs
- Years active: 2011-present
- Subscribers: 1.26 million
- Views: 147.7 million
- Last updated: 16 February 2026
- Website: ontheroofs.com

Ontheroofs is an urban exploration and rooftopping photography project conceived by Vitaliy Raskalov (Ukrainian: Віталій Раскалов) and Vadim Makhorov (Russian: Вадим Махоров; real name - Vadim Yurievich Gurnov), from Ukraine and from Russia respectively. Their main focus of photography is the exploration of high-rise architectural structures like skyscrapers, bridges, historic sites and cathedrals. The team have been notable for their number of free-climbs up famous buildings and monuments around the world. Typically, their videos are uploaded onto YouTube and showcase their ascent and descent. Raskalov and Makhorov appeared as recurring cast in the documentary series URBEX – Enter At Your Own Risk, which launched globally on Red Bull TV on August 1, 2016.

== Members ==
The project was conceived by Vitaliy Raskalov. Raskalov grew up in Kyiv, but at the age of 12, he moved to Moscow, where he would later study journalism, but drop out in 2009 to become a photographer. He met Makhorov, who is from Novosibirsk, while climbing a bridge. In 2017, Raskalov and Makhorov expanded the team to include the New-York based rooftopper Emit, known as em.1t across social media platforms.

== Climbs ==
In 2012, the duo climbed the Mercury City Tower in Moscow.

Raskalov and Makhorov received press attention in early 2014 when they climbed up the Shanghai Tower, the second tallest building in the world. They entered the construction site of the unfinished tower during the Lunar New Year. The popularity of the video sparked a discussion on the safety and the liability of the incident. Later in 2014, they hijacked an LED billboard on the roof of a Hong Kong building, advertising their Shanghai climb on the billboard. They also climbed the Ping An Finance Centre in Shenzhen.

In April 2016, a video was posted of them climbing the Lotte World Tower in Seoul. Despite the construction site having guard dogs, security officers and monitoring drones, Raskalov and Makhorov managed to bypass the security and climb the under construction building.

In 2017, Raskalov and Emit climbed the Central Park Tower. Other structures climbed by Raskalov are the Eiffel Tower, the Great Pyramid of Giza and the statue of Christ the Redeemer.

In 2019, they travelled to the Baikonur Cosmodrone in Southern Kazakhstan and uploaded the video of it to their YouTube channel.
