= Skywalkers: A Love Story =

2024 American film

- Poster
- Directed by: Jeff Zimbalist Maria Bukhonina
- Starring: Ivan Beerkus; Angela Nikolau
- Cinematography: Renato Serrano; Pablo Rojas; Ivan Beerkus; Angela Nikolau
- Edited by: Alannah Byrnes; Jeff Zimbalist
- Music by: Jacques Brautbar; Tereza Dos Santos Costa
- Production companies: XYZ Films; Library Films; All Rise Films
- Distributed by: Netflix
- Release dates: January 18, 2024 (Sundance); July 19, 2024; (Netflix)
- Running time: 100 minutes
- Country: United States
- Languages: English; Russian

Skywalkers: A Love Story is a 2024 American documentary film directed by Jeff Zimbalist and co-directed by Maria Bukhonina, and produced by Zimbalist, Bukhonina, Tamir Ardon, and Chris Smith. It is about rooftopping as it follows Russian couple Angela Nikolau and Vanya Beerkus.

== Cast ==
- Angela Nikolau
- Ivan Beerkus

== Release ==
Skywalkers: A Love Story premiered at the 2024 Sundance Film Festival. A few days later, Netflix acquired distribution rights to the documentary. The film was released in IMAX in July 2024 and on Netflix on July 19, 2024, reaching top 10 status in over two dozen countries.

== Reception ==
On the review aggregator website Rotten Tomatoes, 74% of 58 critics' reviews are positive, with an average rating of 6.5/10. The website's consensus reads: "Blending romance with vertiginous thrill-seeking, Skywalkers: A Love Story is a documentary of truly dizzying proportions." Metacritic, which uses a weighted average, assigned the film a score of 64 out of 100, based on 18 critics, indicating "generally favorable" reviews.

A review by John Nugent for the Empire film magazine gave the film a 3 out of 5 stars rating, praising the film's ability to get under the viewers' skin, but "doesn't quite reach the heights it could." The review also notes how the film could be seen as an advertisement for the couple's signature NFTs. Nell Minow, writing for RogerEbert.com, rated the film 2 out of 4 stars, describing the protagonists as "two careless adrenaline junkies taking ridiculous risks to get likes on social media" and criticizing them for being "completely self-centered".

== See also ==
- Free Solo
- Man on Wire
