= Ping An Finance Centre =

Supertall skyscraper in Shenzhen, Guangdong, China

Coordinates: 22°32′12″N 114°03′01″E

Ping An Finance Centre Chinese: 平安金融中心; pinyin: píng'ān jīnróng zhōngxīn
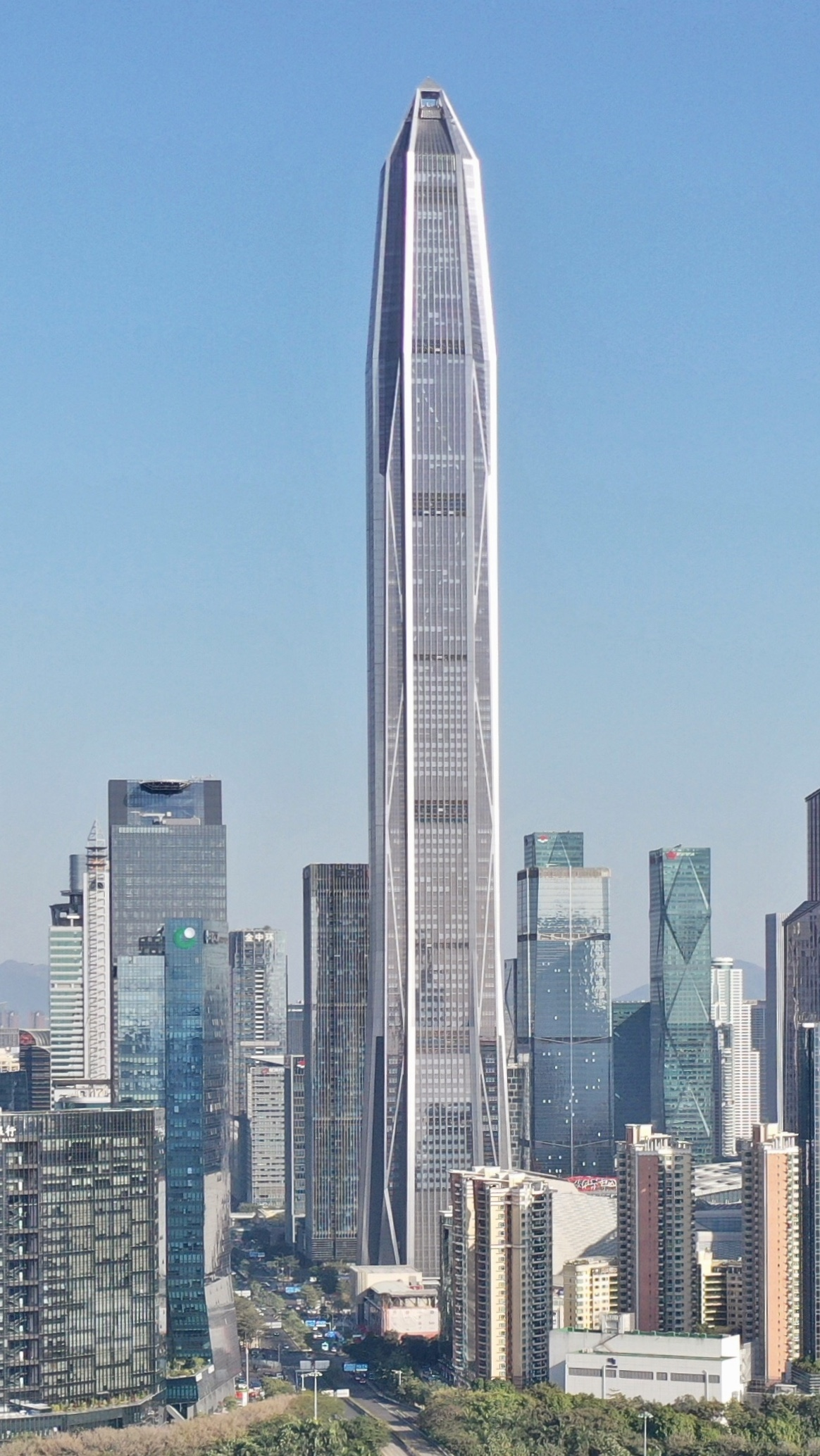
- The Ping An Finance Centre in December 2020

General information
- Status: Completed
- Type: Dining, observation, offices, shopping mall
- Location: 5033 Yitian Road, Futian District, Shenzhen, Guangdong, China
- Groundbreaking: 29 August 2009
- Construction started: 18 January 2010
- Completed: 28 March 2017; 9 years ago
- Cost: $1.5 billion (USD, estimated)
- Owner: Ping An Life Insurance Company of China

Height
- Architectural: 599.1 m (1,966 ft)
- Top floor: 555.1 m (1,821 ft)
- Observatory: 562.1 m (1,844 ft)

Technical details
- Floor count: 118 aboveground levels, plus 5 belowground basement levels
- Floor area: 459,187 m^{2} (4,942,650 sq ft)
- Lifts/elevators: 80 (mall included)

Design and construction
- Architect: Kohn Pedersen Fox Associates
- Developer: Ping An Life Insurance Company of China
- Engineer: J. Roger Preston, Limited (MEP)
- Structural engineer: Thornton Tomasetti
- Main contractor: China Construction First Building Group

Chinese name
- Simplified Chinese: 平安金融中心
- Traditional Chinese: 平安金融中心
- Literal meaning: Ping An Finance Centre
Transcriptions
Standard Mandarin
- Hanyu Pinyin: Píng'ān Jīnróng Zhōngxīn
Yue: Cantonese
- Jyutping: ping_{4}ngon_{1} gam^{1}jung^{4} zung^{1}sam^{1}

The Ping An Finance Center (Chinese: 平安金融中心; pinyin: Píng'ān Jīnróng Zhōngxīn) is a 115-storey, 599.1-metre (1,966-foot) supertall skyscraper in Shenzhen, Guangdong, China. It was completed in 2017, and is the tallest building in Shenzhen, the 2nd tallest building in China (after the Shanghai Tower), and the 5th tallest building in the world. The building contains office, hotel and retail spaces, a conference center, and a high-end shopping mall.

== Observation deck ==
The observation deck is named Free Sky and is located on floor 116, which broke the record of having the highest observation deck in a building at 562.5 m (1,845 ft). The observation deck allows 360-degree views. Inside there are a transparent viewing area, interactive experience area, and special display area to showcase youth cultures with Shenzhen special characteristics through multimedia facilities. The opening hours are 10am to 8pm, last entry 7.15pm.

== Features ==
The building houses the headquarters of Ping An Insurance, with their company name representing the building name. The building was commissioned by Ping An Insurance and designed by the American architectural firm Kohn Pedersen Fox Associates. The design of the building is meant to be unique and elegant, and to represent the history and achievements of the main tenant. A stainless-steel facade that weighs approximately 1,700 metric tons (3,700,000 lb) provides a modern design to the building.

It is the second largest skyscraper in the world by floor area after Azabudai Hills Main Tower in Tokyo, Japan. The building has a gross floor area of 378,600 square metres (4,075,000 square feet). The 115-storey tower has a width-to-height aspect ratio of 1:10 and also has an 11-story podium. Including the podium, the building has 495,520 m^{2} (5,333,700 sq ft) of floor space. A five-level basement adds 90,000 m^{2} (970,000 sq ft). The 620,000-metric-ton (1.37×10^{9} lb; 620,000,000 kg) tower has eight main columns which form the superstructure. The column dimensions range from approximately 6 by 3.2 m (19 ft 8 in by 10 ft 6 in) at the lowest level to 2.9 by 1.4 m (9 ft 6 in by 4 ft 7 in) at the top of the tower.

== Phase 2 ==
The second building of the project, a 290-metre (950 ft), 47-story skyscraper known as the South Tower, has been completed. Construction began in April 2014 and it opened in 2018/19. The complex includes a 5-star Park Hyatt hotel, a planned retail bridge connecting the two skyscrapers from levels 3 through 6.

== Elevators ==
The Ping An International Finance Center is equipped with 33 double deck elevators, travelling at maximum speeds of up to 10 m/s (2,000 ft/min).

== Floor Plan ==
Ping An Finance Centre Floor Plan
Floor	Purpose
118	ALTITUDES Restaurant
117	ALTITUDES Restaurant
116	Free Sky Observatory (547.6 m)
115	Inakaya Restaurant
114	Refuge Floor, Tuned mass damper display
113	Mechanical Floor
112	Ping An Headquarter (Office Zone 7)
111	Ping An Headquarter (Office Zone 7)
110	Ping An Headquarter (Office Zone 7)
109	Ping An Headquarter (Office Zone 7)
108	Office Zone 7
107	Office Zone 7
106	Office Zone 7
105	Office Zone 7
104	Office Zone 7
103	Office Zone 7
102	Office Zone 7
101	Office Zone 7
100	Office Zone 7
99	Office Zone 7
97	Mechanical Floor, Refuge Floor
96	Office Zone 6
95	Office Zone 6
94	Office Zone 6
93	Office Zone 6
92	Office Zone 6
91	Office Zone 6
90	Office Zone 6
89	Office Zone 6
88	Office Zone 6
87	Office Zone 6
86	Office Zone 6
85	Office Zone 6
84	Sky Lobby
83	Sky Lobby
82M	Mechanical Floor
82	Mechanical Floor
81	Refuge Floor
80	Office Zone 5
79	Office Zone 5
78	Office Zone 5
77	Office Zone 5
76	Office Zone 5
75	Office Zone 5
74	Office Zone 5
73	Office Zone 5
72	Office Zone 5
71	Office Zone 5
70	Office Zone 5
69	Office Zone 5
68	Office Zone 5
67	Office Zone 5
65	Refuge Floor
64	Office Zone 4
63	Office Zone 4
62	Office Zone 4
61	Office Zone 4
60	Office Zone 4
59	Office Zone 4
58	Office Zone 4
57	Office Zone 4
56	Office Zone 4
55	Office Zone 4
54	Office Zone 4
53	Office Zone 4
52	Sky Lobby
51	Sky Lobby
50M	Mechanical Floor
50	Mechanical Floor
49	Refuge Floor
48	Office Zone 3
47	Office Zone 3
46	Office Zone 3
45	Office Zone 3
44	Office Zone 3
43	Office Zone 3
42	Office Zone 3
41	Office Zone 3
40	Office Zone 3
39	Office Zone 3
38	Office Zone 3
37	Office Zone 3
35	Refuge Floor
34	Office Zone 2
33	Office Zone 2
32	Office Zone 2
31	Office Zone 2
30	Office Zone 2
29	Office Zone 2
28	Office Zone 2
27	Office Zone 2
26	Mechanical Floor
25	Refuge Floor
24	Office Zone 1
23	Office Zone 1
22	Office Zone 1
21	Office Zone 1
20	Office Zone 1
19	Office Zone 1
18	Office Zone 1
17	Office Zone 1
16	Office Zone 1
15	Office Zone 1
14	Office Zone 1
13	Office Zone 1
12	Office Zone 1
11	Office Zone 1
10	Refuge Floor
9	Mechanical Floor
8	Office Lobby, Access to PA Mall
7	Office Lobby, Access to PA Mall
6	PA Mall
5	PA Mall
4	Free Sky Exit, Access to PA Mall
3	Office Lobby, Access to PA Mall
2	Office Lobby, Access to PA Mall
1	Office Lobby, Access to PA Mall
B1	Free Sky Entrance, Office Lobby
B2	Free Sky Entrance, Loading Zone
B3	Parking
B4	Parking
B5	Parking

== History ==
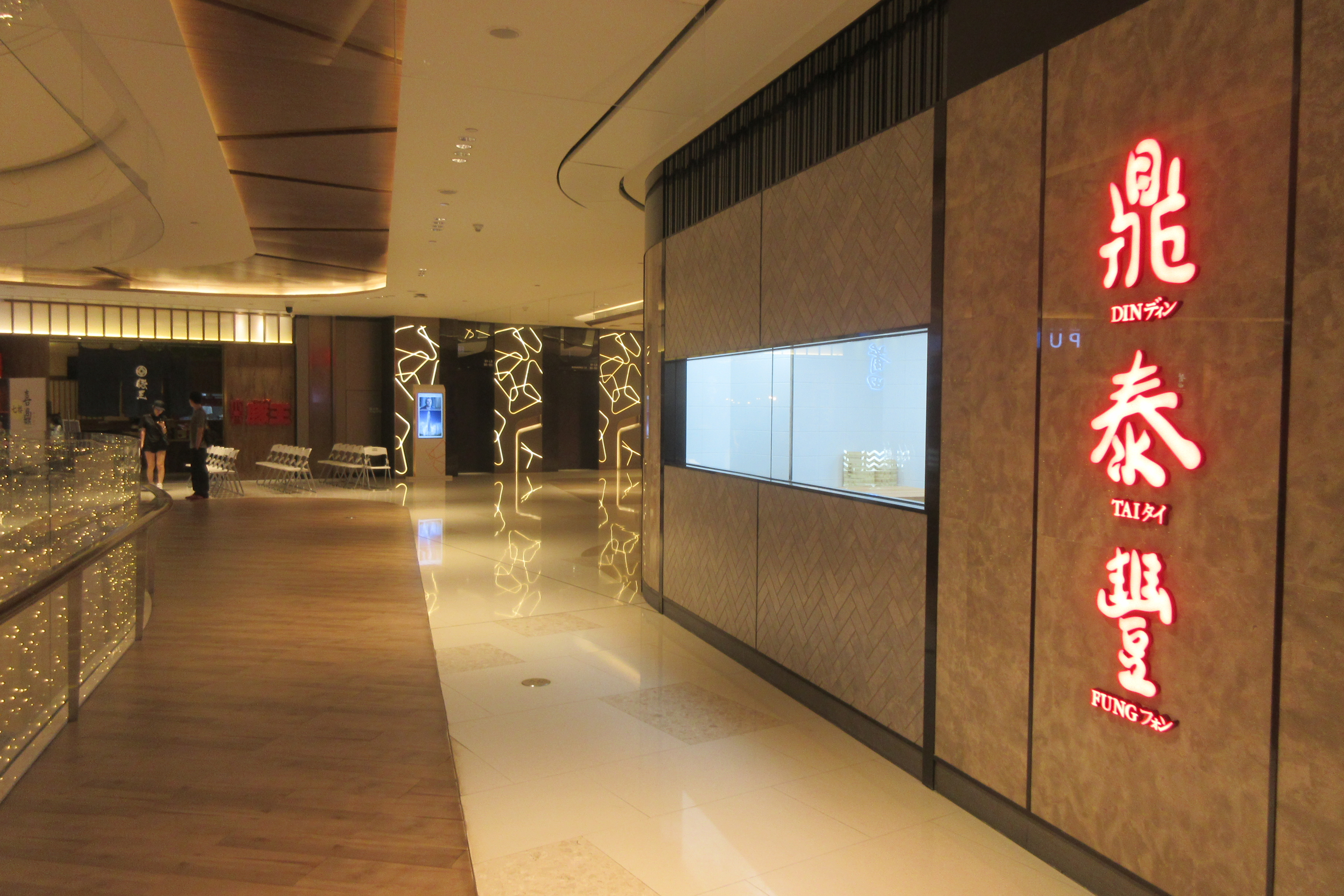
PAFC Mall in April 2019

The building is located within the Central Business District of Shenzhen in Futian. Its 18,391 m^{2} (197,960 sq ft) lot was purchased by Ping An Group via auction at a price of 1.6568 billion RMB on 6 November 2007. Design of the building began in 2008 with Kohn Pedersen Fox Associates providing the architectural design and Thornton Tomasetti providing structural design. Its foundation stone was laid on 29 August 2009, and construction started in November the same year. China Construction First Building Group was hired as the general contractor to construct the building.

In the middle of March 2013, the construction process was temporarily halted, due to the suspected use of concrete made with unprocessed sea sand, which could corrode the steel structure. Construction resumed on the building shortly after the sample testing results were released by Shenzhen Housing and Construction Bureau in late March of that year, which concluded that it complied with the required standards.

On the morning of 15 July 2014, upon a 10-metre (33 ft)-long steel column being lifted to place, the skyscraper exceeded 443.8 metres (1,456 ft) in height, surpassing the KK100 Tower to become the tallest building in Shenzhen.

The building was topped out on 30 April 2015, and became the second tallest skyscraper in China at a height of 599.1 metres (1,966 ft). The original plan was to add a 60-metre (200 ft)-long antenna atop the building to surpass the Shanghai Tower and become the tallest building in China. However, in February 2015, it was decided that the antenna would not top the tower due to the possibility that it might obstruct flight paths.

== Climbing attempts ==
The Ping An Financial Center building has been the subject of frequent rooftopping attempts. In January 2015, daredevil Malaysian photographer Keow Wee Loong climbed the then incomplete building and released video footage and a photo taken from a crane at the tower's top.

The structure was subsequently climbed during the period of the Chinese New Year on 19 February 2015 by two Russian and Ukrainian urban explorers, Vadim Makhorov and Vitaly Raskalov from Ontheroofs, who further climbed out to a crane above the under-construction tower and documented their ascent with video and photos.

== Previous status ==
=== Low occupancy ===
According to South China Morning Post, almost 30 percent of the office space remained empty in the second quarter of 2019.

== See also ==
- Burj Khalifa
- Shanghai Tower
- List of tallest buildings in Shenzhen
- List of tallest buildings in China
- List of tallest buildings in the world
- List of buildings with 100 floors or more
