= URBEX – Enter At Your Own Risk =

- Genre: Documentary Series
- Original language: English
- No. of series: 1
- No. of episodes: 8

Production
- Producers: Colleen Flynn; Morgan Roberts; Jay Brown; Sebastian Krenmayr
- Production locations: Moscow, Melbourne, Malaysia, Mumbai, Copenhagen, Kazakhstan, Dubai, Toronto, Marseille, Bulgaria
- Running time: 45 minutes
- Production company: K2/ KEO Films

Original release
- Network: Red Bull TV
- Release: 1 August 2016 – present

URBEX – Enter At Your Own Risk (abbreviated URBEX) is an eight-part original series that launched globally on Red Bull TV on August 1, 2016. Urbex is a documentary series that chronicles the motivations, mindsets and adventures of today's new type of explorers, Urban Explorers, who explore areas above, around and below the world's most famous cities, climbing cranes and bridges, descending into subway networks, infiltrating monuments to industry and commerce old and new. Urbex stands for Urban Exploration. The series was filmed in locations across the world including Moscow, Melbourne, Malaysia, Mumbai, Copenhagen, Kazakhstan, Dubai, Toronto, Marseille and Bulgaria with some of the world's most famous urban explorers like Oleg Cricket and Ontheroofs' Vitaliy Raskalov and Vadim Makhorov. The series was promoted with digital enhancement 360-degree videos.

== Cast ==
- Oleg Cricket: A fearless Russian daredevil who is not afraid of doing stunts that even the most seasoned athletes would not dare to do.
- Abudi Alsagoff: A professional freerunner and parkour athlete from Malaysia.
- Vitaliy Raskalov: YouTube sensation who became infamous due to jaw dropping videos of free-climbing some of the tallest bridges and skyscrapers like the Shanghai Tower.
- Vadim Makhorov: YouTube sensation who together with Vitaliy, is the creator of the acclaimed photography project Ontheroofs.
- Elaina Hammeken: Born in Switzerland, this Danish daredevil coined Copenhagen's Catwoman used to be a pro snowboarder but her career ended early due to an accident. She was a contestant on America's Next Top Model while obtaining her master's degree in Economics & Finance in Copenhagen.
- Bryce Wilson: Australian Urban Explorer (aka Australia's Spider-Man) who has been taken to court for climbing sky scrapers in Melbourne.
- Max Ross: California resident who was inspired by YouTube videos to start Urban Exploration himself.
- David De Rueda: French photographer who has a passion to explore abandoned places.

== Episodes ==
No.	Title	Cast	Locations	Synopsis
1	Unstoppable	Oleg Cricket, Bryce Wilson	Moscow, Melbourne	"Unstoppable" looks at the games of cat and mouse that urban explorers play with the buildings' security guards and lengths they're willing go to in an effort to outwit them. Oleg is planning to infiltrate one of the most heavily guarded bridges in Moscow, the Zhivopisny Bridge. But the landmark is fitted with motion detectors and armed security guards and he must call in expert help to make it to the top. Meanwhile, Bryce is hoping to climb a local landmark of his own in his native Melbourne (Coop's Shot Tower). He has taken along friend and relative novice Eric for company – but it soon transpires that Eric is scared of heights and the security guards are watching their every move.
2	Unafraid	Abudi Alsagoff, Vitaliy Raskalov, Vadim Makhorov	Malaysia, Mumbai	"Unafraid" explores the question why those Urban Explorers, who climb the world's tallest skyscrapers and whose vertigo inducing videos are watched by millions online do not show any sign of fear. The episode features Abudi, an urban explorer from Malaysia who overcomes his fear by painstakingly practicing each move, spending hours in the gym constantly perfecting his moves. His latest infiltration will involve one of his most impressive feats yet: a handstand performed on the iconic Seri Wawasan Bridge in his home city of Kuala Lumpur. Vadim and Vitaliy – two of the world's most famous Urban Explorers - head to Mumbai where they will attempt to climb a crane at the top of one of the city's new modern skyscrapers: Palais Royale.
3	Unrestricted	Oleg Cricket, Elaina Hammeken	Moscow, Copenhagen	Although urban explorers come from all walks of life and all backgrounds, most are united by a certain disregard for authority. "Unrestricted" looks at the influence counter culture plays in Urbex as with Oleg in Moscow. He is hoping to infiltrate a skyscraper in the city's new financial district (IQ Quarter). He hopes it will serve as a statement against the country's rich and powerful elite, but security will be tight. For this mission, Oleg is bringing along his girlfriend. In Denmark, former model Elaina, an Urban explorer from America who has settled down in Copenhagen, heads out into the night to discover the secret side to the city. For her urban exploration is about a refusal to accept rules at face value and a desire to do things her way.
4	Unloved	Bryce Wilson, Max Ross, Zack Burke	Melbourne, Toronto	While urban exploration may be watched and admired by millions online, it is not without its detractors. Many explorers receive fierce criticism from the press and public and in Australia, Bryce has felt this hate first hand. He became infamous for a crane climb on top of a construction site in downtown Melbourne, The Prima Pearl. He was dragged through the courts and was on the receiving end of a sustained attack in the media. The episode shows him as he prepares to head back to the site of the crane which sparked the initial public outcry – now a glistening, fully formed skyscraper. Elsewhere, Californians Max and Zack have arrived in Toronto with high hopes. But as they soon find out, the city is clamping down on rooftopping and getting a view of the spectacular skyline might be harder than it looks.
5	Unlimited	Oleg Cricket, Abudi Alsagoff, David De Rueda	Dubai, Kazakhstan	Explorations now take place in every country and almost every city on earth, but there are a select few sites that are so risky to conquer that only the most daring urban explorers will even attempt them. David is a Frenchman who prides himself on going above and beyond in pursuit of the biggest Urbex challenges. His next infiltration will be no different. David is planning to head to Kazakhstan, trek overnight through the Kazak desert and sneak past the Russian military in order to see a legendary Space Centre (Baikonur Cosmodrome), said to house an abandoned Soviet-era space shuttle. Meanwhile, Oleg and Abudi have teamed up to visit Dubai, perhaps the most alluring skyline in the world, but one which comes with the harshest punishments should they be caught in the act.
6	Unknown	Vitaliy Raskalov, Vadim Makhorov, Max Ross, Zack Burke	Mumbai, Moscow, Toronto	With millions of people heading out and exploring their local cities and millions more watching online, this has been called the golden age of Urbex. But its future is uncertain. Vidam and Vitaliy are finishing their 10-day Urbex trip to India. They are attempting to scale one of the tallest buildings in the city, but having climbed all over the world and done so much to make urbex popular, they feel their exploration days might now be numbered. Meanwhile, the next generation is finding it increasingly difficult to follow in their footsteps. Max and Zack are in Canada, wondering if their photography future might lie at ground level. But they still want to get one more glimpse of the Toronto skyline before they head home.
7	Unseen	David De Rueda, Elaina Hammeken	Marseille, Copenhagen	Not all urban exploration is about going to the tallest buildings. Many people first get into urbex because of a fundamental desire to seek out the hidden side of their city – the hidden places that the rest of the world ignores and the forgotten history of buildings long-since abandoned. David is an urban explorer whose photographs are displayed in galleries and sell all over the world. He spends hours perfecting each photo and only wants to go to the most fascinating places to take them. The episode features David as he takes on a national monument in Marseille before heading north, hoping to get into a decaying 1950s French battleship, moored off the coast of Brittany. Elaina is also drawn to the more secretive side of the city. She and long time collaborator Anders head out to visit some abandoned tunnels under Copenhagen's historic Carlsberg district before heading to an iconic bridge in the middle of city.
8	Untouchable	Oleg Cricket, Abudi Alsagoff, Vitaliy Raskalov, Vadim Makhorov	Dubai, Bulgaria	As urban exploration has been drawn ever more into the public spotlight, there has been a growing pressure for each video to be more amazing and more jaw dropping that the last. This competition to be the best has led to the most extreme urban explorers going further and further to make their videos stand out. Oleg and Abudi are in Dubai – one of the most challenging locations to explore on the planet. The pair are hoping to scale the tallest residential building in the world: Marina 101. But they have very different approaches and Oleg seems determined to make a name for himself. Meanwhile, Vidam and Vitaliy are planning a trip to a huge Soviet-era ceremonial building, the Buzludzha Monument, which lies crumbling and abandoned on a remote mountain in Bulgaria. But just going there is not enough to truly make their video stand out, they plan to hang a giant 25m square banner from the top. And getting in is not as straight forward as they first thought.
