= Angela Nikolau =

Russian rooftopper and urban climber (born 1993)

- Born: Angelina Nikolaeva; 29 June 1993 (age 33); Moscow, Russia
- Occupations: Rooftopper, urban climber, influencer
- Partner(s): Ivan Beerkus (2016–present; engaged)

Angelina "Angela" Nikolau (born 29 June 1993) is a Russian rooftopper, urban climber, and artist who gained recognition due to her unusual photographs taken on the roofs of skyscrapers around the world, including the Empire State Building in July 2026.

== Early life ==
Angelina Nikolau was born in Moscow on 29 June 1993, to a family with a history of involvement in circus art, and with Greek descent. For the first six years of school, she attended public schools, later transferring to a Christian School of Arts. Nikolau did rhythmic gymnastics from the age of seven until she was 16. She has worked as an art teacher for children since she was 16. After graduating, Nikolau entered the Russian State Specialized Academy of Arts. She studied there for five years but left during her senior year to pursue her passion in rooftopping and photography.

== Rooftopping and urban climbing ==
Nikolau took her first rooftop images in Moscow. After she actively traveled around the world and published photos taken at height.

In 2015, Nikolau was engaged as a witness in an investigation against a rooftopper Vladimir Podrezov and his friends who painted the star of the Stalinist skyscraper on Kotelnicheskaya Embankment into Ukrainian flag colours.

In 2016, Nikolau and fellow rooftopper Ivan Beerkus went to China to scale the highest construction site in the world. The pair climbed Goldin Finance 117 in Tianjin and the construction crane at the top of the tower. As of April 2020, the video shot by the two was viewed more than 920,000 times. The video attracted the attention of the global media.

In 2017, Nikolau played the main character in the Danish documentary On the Edge of Freedom.

In 2018, she played one of the lead roles in a Who is Next? documentary by Slovak documentarian Miro Drobný.

In 2022, Nikolau and Beerkus scaled the rooftop of the Malaysian skyscraper Merdeka 118 - the second-tallest building in the world. This event was covered by multiple media around the world. Instagram videos of the accomplishment reached 8.6 million views.

=== Empire State Building climb ===
On 1 July 2026, Nikolau and fellow rooftopper Ivan Beerkus climbed the spire of the Empire State Building in New York City. During the climb, the pair unfurled a banner bearing the message, "When the power of love beats the love of power, the world knows peace." While descending the structure, Beerkus appeared to propose marriage to Nikolau, and she accepted. Both were subsequently arrested by the New York City Police Department and charged with burglary, reckless endangerment, criminal trespass, criminal mischief, criminal tampering, disorderly conduct, possession of burglar's tools, and related offenses. They are scheduled for a court hearing on August 24th 2026.

== In media ==
Nikolau gained 730,000 followers on Instagram during her career.

Nikolau creates non-fungible tokens (NFTs) using photographs of her pursuits. Her works were included in the NFT Yearbook in 2022.

Angela and Beerkus are the focus of the feature-length documentary Skywalkers: A Love Story, which premiered at the Sundance Festival in 2024 and was acquired by Netflix in the same year.

== Personal life ==
Nikolau has been in a relationship with Ivan Beerkus since 2016. Up until 2024, the pair were living in New York City. According to the New York City Police Department the pair currently live in East Orange, New Jersey.
