= Justin Casquejo =

American stunt performer and skyscraper climber

- Born: October 24, 1997 (age 29); Weehawken, New Jersey, U.S.
- Years active: 2014-present
- Known for: Rooftopping

Justin Casquejo (born October 24, 1997), also known online as LiveJN, is an American rooftopper, free solo climber and stunt performer of Filipino descent. He has scaled several skyscrapers in Manhattan, New York City, as well as a water tower in his hometown, Weehawken, New Jersey, and has been arrested, charged, and convicted for some of his activities. Others have been brought to light through his publication on social media, such as Instagram and YouTube.

== One World Trade Center ==
In March 2014, Casquejo climbed to the top of the topped-out, but not yet completed, 1,776-foot (541 m) One World Trade Center. Casquejo, then 16 years old, entered the site through a hole in a fence. He was subsequently arrested on trespassing charges. He allegedly dressed like a construction worker, sneaked in, and convinced an elevator operator to lift him to the tower's 88th floor, according to news sources. He then used stairways to get to the 104th floor, walked past a sleeping security guard, and climbed up a ladder to get to the antenna, where he took pictures for two hours. The elevator operator was reassigned, and the guard was fired. It was then revealed that officials had failed to install security cameras in the tower, which facilitated Casquejo's entry to the site.

In July 2014, in a plea agreement, Casquejo admitted to breaking a city misdemeanor law against scaling tall buildings without permission. He was sentenced to 23 days of service (which he completed with an extra six days). He submitted, as was required, a 1,200-word essay explaining what he had learned from the episode.

== Weehawken Water Tower ==
In September 2014, Casquejo was again arrested for scaling the 175-foot (53 m) Weehawken Water Tower. He was charged with defiant trespassing and resisting arrest.

== 70 Pine Street ==
On February 21, 2016, Casquejo was charged with misdemeanor BASE jumping and trespassing for climbing above the roof at 70 Pine Street, an 850-foot (260 m), 67-story luxury apartment in the Financial District. He avoided jail time in the sentencing on September 6, 2017, after pleading guilty to BASE jumping. He was granted youthful offender status; the case will eventually be sealed.

== Paramount Tower ==
In June 2017, Casquejo was arrested at the 568-foot (173 m) Paramount, a 52-story residential skyscraper on East 39th Street in Turtle Bay, Manhattan. In September 2017 Casquejo pleaded guilty to second-degree trespass in exchange for three years' probation for scaling the luxury apartment building.

== Unapprehended climbs ==
In addition to those situations where he has been apprehended, Casquejo has posted images of climbing the George Washington Bridge and buildings near Times Square, Columbus Circle, and the Empire State Building and Trump Tower.

He has a large following on Instagram and YouTube.

== 220 Central Park South ==
In November 2016 Casquejo hung from a construction crane at the not-yet-completed 950-foot (290 m) 220 Central Park South.

== Other climbs and arrests ==
Despite his probation, Casquejo has made other climbs, for which he was arrested. As of January 2024, he regularly shares Instagram reels featuring himself engaging in similar feats of climbing tall structures, primarily in New York City, but also in Hong Kong.

== See also ==
- BASE jumping
- Rooftopping
