= Vanity height =

Height difference between a skyscraper's pinnacle and its highest usable floor

Comparison of the vanity height (as defined as the difference between the pinnacle height and the height to the floor of the highest occupied top floor) of some buildings which have been the world's tallest

Vanity height is defined by the Council on Tall Buildings and Urban Habitat (CTBUH) as the height difference between a skyscraper's pinnacle and the highest usable floor (usually observatory, office, restaurant, retail or hotel/residential). Because the CTBUH ranks the world's tallest buildings by height to pinnacle, a number of buildings appear higher in the rankings than they otherwise would due to extremely long spires.

The controversy began when the Petronas Towers were named the world's tallest buildings in 1998, despite having a roof 63.4 m (208 ft) lower than that of the Willis Tower. The world's tallest building, Burj Khalifa, is officially 828 meters tall, but its highest usable floor is 585m above ground. Therefore, its vanity height is 244 meters or 29% of the building's total height. Without this vanity height, the Burj Khalifa would still be the tallest building in the world, but only exceeding the Shanghai Tower's highest usable floor by 2 meters.

The next potentially tallest building, the Jeddah Tower, could be over 1,000 meters tall, but its highest floor is planned to be 630m above ground. The top 370m (equivalent to an 85-story building), or 37% of the building's total height, will be unusable. When vanity height is excluded, the height progression of the world's tallest buildings looks much more modest.

The CTBUH requires a structure's vanity height to be under 50% to be defined as a "building." Otherwise, it is considered a communications tower and ineligible for the rankings.

As of September 2023, the world's 100 tallest completed buildings had an average vanity height of 12.6%, while in the case of megatall buildings, the average vanity height increased to 20.2%. Geographically, the highest average vanity height, 17.0%, was recorded in the Middle East, while the lowest, 10.7%, was recorded in China.

World's tallest spires and their vanity height:

Building	Height to architectural top	Height to highest occupied floor	Spire height	Vanity height as % of architectural height
Burj Khalifa	828.4 m (2,718 ft)	585.4 m (1,921 ft)	242.6 m (796 ft)	29.3%
Merdeka 118	678.9 m (2,227 ft)	502.8 m (1,650 ft)	176.1 m (578 ft)	25.9%
One World Trade Center	541.3 m (1,776 ft)	386.5 m (1,268 ft)	154.8 m (508 ft)	28.6%
Zifeng Tower	450.0 m (1,476.4 ft)	316.6 m (1,039 ft)	133.4 m (438 ft)	29.6%
Bank of America Tower	356.8 m (1,171 ft)	234.5 m (769 ft)	131.3 m (431 ft)	35.9%

== See also ==
- List of tallest buildings
