= Merdeka Maybank =

Megatall skyscraper in Kuala Lumpur, Malaysia

Merdeka Maybank Tower
- Malay: Menara Merdeka Maybank
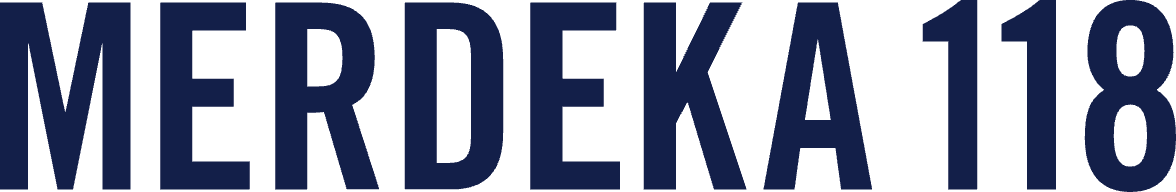

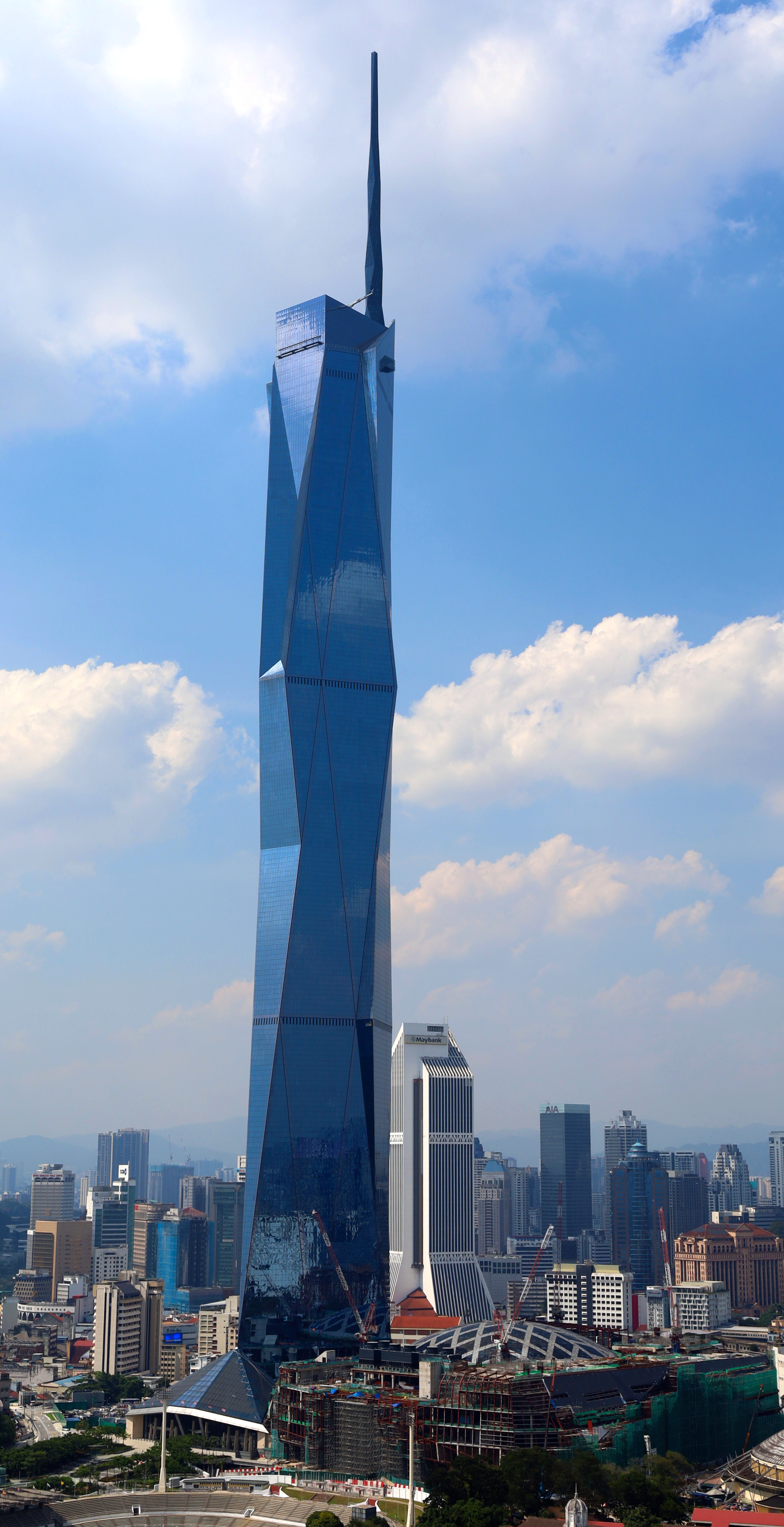
- Merdeka 118 in October 2024
- Former names: Menara Warisan Merdeka (lit. 'Independence Heritage Tower'), KL 118, PNB 118, Merdeka 118
- Alternative names: Menara Merdeka Maybank (official name); Merdeka Tower

Record height
- Tallest in Southeast Asia since 2021^{[I]}
- Preceded by: Landmark 81

General information
- Status: Completed
- Type: Mixed-use: Shopping complex, housing properties, hotel, observation, public park, office
- Architectural style: Neo-futurism and Malay traditional songket pattern
- Location: Jalan Hang Jebat, Kuala Lumpur, Malaysia, Menara Merdeka 118, Presint Merdeka 118, 50118 Kuala Lumpur, Malaysia, Malaysia
- Coordinates: 3°08′30″N 101°42′03″E
- Named for: Malaysian Independence
- Groundbreaking: July 2014; 12 years ago
- Topped-out: 30 November 2021; 4 years ago
- Completed: November 2023; 3 years ago
- Opened: 10 January 2024; 2 years ago
- Cost: RM5 billion
- Owner: PNB Merdeka Ventures Sdn Bhd (under PNB)

Height
- Architectural: 678.9 m (2,227 ft)
- Tip: 680.5 m (2,233 ft)
- Antenna spire: 160.7 m (527 ft)
- Roof: 518.2 m (1,700 ft)
- Top floor: 502.8 m (1,650 ft)
- Observatory: 566 m (1,857 ft) (Level spire); 519 m (1,703 ft) (View at 118)

Technical details
- Structural system: Steel; Reinforced concrete Concrete encased steel
- Floor count: 118 (with 5 basements)
- Floor area: 292,000 m^{2} (3,140,000 sq ft)
- Lifts/elevators: 89

Design and construction
- Architect: Fender Katsalidis in association with RSP KL
- Developer: PNB Merdeka Ventures Sdn Bhd
- Structural engineer: LERA Consulting Structural Engineers, Robert Bird Group in association with Arup
- Main contractor: Samsung C&T; UEM Group
- Known for: First skyscraper to exceed 500 m (1,600 ft) and 600 m (2,000 ft) in Malaysia and Southeast Asia

Other information
- Parking: 20,000 parking bays
- Public transit: KG17 Merdeka MRT station MR3 Maharajalela Monorail station AG8 SP8 Plaza Rakyat LRT station via KG17 Merdeka

Website
- merdeka118.com

Merdeka Maybank Tower (Malay: Menara Merdeka Maybank), formerly known as Merdeka 118, Menara Warisan Merdeka, (Note: English: Independence Heritage Tower) KL 118, and PNB 118, is a 118-story megatall skyscraper in the Merdeka Precinct, Kuala Lumpur, Malaysia. At 678.9 metres (2,227 feet) tall, it is the second tallest building in the world. The structure was completed in November 2023, celebrating its grand opening on 10 January 2024, but the building was not opened to the public as scheduled. Finally, on 7 August 2025, the Park Hyatt Kuala Lumpur Hotel began operation on levels 75 to 112. The rest of the project remains far behind schedule as of 1 July 2026, still under construction with most areas closed to the public.

The building's name, Merdeka, which means "independence" in Malay, is inspired by its proximity to Stadium Merdeka. The spire of the building was completed in December 2022, which marked its final height of 678.9 m (2,227 ft) above ground and 700.9 m (2,300 ft) above sea level.

It is the tallest building in Malaysia—surpassing the 451.9-metre (1,483 ft) Petronas Twin Towers—and in Southeast Asia, surpassing the 462-metre (1,516 ft) Landmark 81. The building will also be the first in Malaysia to receive a triple platinum rating from worldwide sustainability certifications such as Green Building Index (GBI), including LEED.

On 30 July 2026, Merdeka 118 Tower was officially renamed as Merdeka Maybank Tower (Menara Merdeka Maybank) after one of its anchor tenants, Maybank Berhad.

== Building ==
The project was announced by the then-Prime Minister Datuk Seri Abdullah Bin Ahmad Badawi on 12 September 2007 as a watershed chapter in PNB’s illustrious history. When it was completed in 2023, the tower became the tallest building in Malaysia. It was constructed in three phases and consists of 400,000 square metres (4,300,000 sq ft) of residential, hotel and commercial space.

The building is a mix of office spaces, hotels, and retail outlets and an observatory floor which is the highest observation deck in Southeast Asia. It has two observation decks, the first inside the building and the second inside the spire, and a retail business center (118 Mall). It will be surrounded by four acres of urban and linear parks. The non-rentable space consists of elevators, recreational and maintenance facilities, as well as parking spaces for up to 8,500 cars. Sixty out of the 80 storeys of office space will be reserved for Permodalan Nasional Berhad (PNB), the developer of the project, and its subsidiaries.

== Funding ==
The Merdeka 118 precinct is a 7.7-hectare (19-acre) land development funded by Permodalan Nasional Berhad (PNB), a state-owned enterprise of the Malaysian government.

The budget of RM5 billion has faced criticism from many Malaysians, saying that the money was in essence public money and could have been better used elsewhere, such as for basic infrastructure and a raise in the minimum wage. In 2016, Prime Minister Najib Razak, who would eventually be directly involved with the 1MDB scandal, claimed that the project was not a waste and it would "bring more benefits" by generating "economic opportunities".

== Site ==
The building is situated on Jalan Hang Jebat, on the location of the former Merdeka Park (subsequently repurposed into an open-air car park). The site lies within the vicinity of landmarks such as Petaling Street, sporting venues including Merdeka Stadium, Stadium Negara and the Chin Woo Stadium, three schools (the Victoria Institution, the Methodist Boys' School and the Chinese-type Jalan Davidson Primary School), and the stalled Plaza Rakyat project (across the Ampang Line).

The Merdeka 118 development also has access to the newly built Merdeka MRT station on the Kajang Line (SBK) and is directly linked from three major roads via the Belfield Tunnel, which is a 2-storey underground tunnel passing underneath Kampung Attap and Jalan Maharajalela to the basement of the precinct.

== Design ==
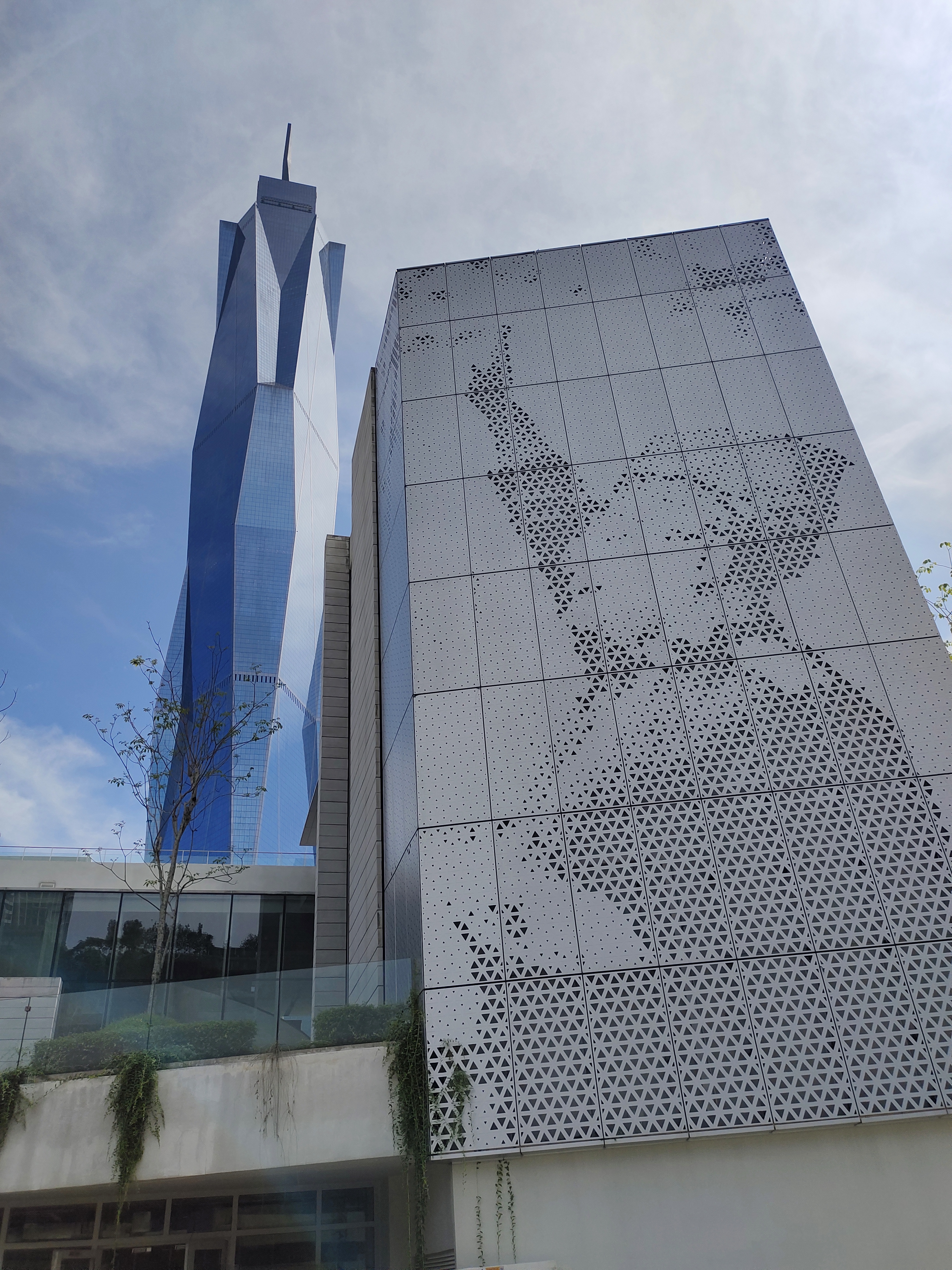
Merdeka 118 was designed to resemble Tunku Abdul Rahman's stature as he proclaimed Malaysian independence on 31 August 1957, chanting "Merdeka!" seven times.

The building is designed with a mixture of diamond-shaped glass facades to signify the diversity of Malaysians. The design was made to resemble and inspired by Tunku Abdul Rahman's outstretched hand gesture while chanting "Merdeka!", when he proclaimed the independence of Malaya on 31 August 1957. The building's cladding was to comprise 18,144 panels, 114,000 square-meter of glass, and 1,600 tonnes of window frame extrusions. It was to contain the 118 Mall, Grade-A offices, hotels, and residential areas. The structural engineers were Leslie E. Robertson Associates and Robert Bird Group while the civil and structural engineer of record for this tower is Arup. The building has been equipped and illuminated at night with 8.4 kilometres of LED light strips which would gradually move from one corner to another. The Neapoli Group, an environmental design and engineering firm, was employed to provide consultancy services towards achieving platinum rating with three Green Building certification bodies: Green Building Index (GBI), Leadership in Energy and Environmental Design (LEED), and GreenRE.

== Floor Plans ==
Level	Purpose
125	Spire Access Point
124	Roof Access Point
122 -123	Mechanical layer 8
121	Mechanical layer 7
119 - 120	Mechanical layer 6
118	(The View @118) Upper Indoor Observatory, Gift Shop
117	(The View @118) Luxury Restaurant, Conference Centre, VIP Lounge
116M	(The View @118) Glass floor, Shops, Cafe, 118 Edge Walk
116	(The View @118) Lower Indoor Observatory, Outdoor Observatory
115	(The View @118) Multi Purpose Event Hall, Banquet Hall
114	Merdeka Business Center, Limonaia, Sky Rooms
113	Mechanical layer 5
109 - 112	Park Hyatt Hotel Guestrooms
104 - 108	Park Hyatt Hotel Guestrooms
100 - 103	Park Hyatt Hotel Guestrooms
99	Park Hyatt Indoor Pool, Sky Gym, Sky Spa
98	Park Hyatt Hotel Executive Salons
97	Park Hyatt Hotel Office
91 - 96	High Zone Offices (PNB Headquarters)
86 - 90	High Zone Offices
81 - 85	High Zone Offices
78 - 80	High Zone Offices
77 - 77M	Mechanical layer 4
76	High Zone Office Sky Lobby / PNB Headquarters Sky Lobbies
75	Park Hyatt Hotel Sky Lobbies, Reception, Merdeka Grill Restaurant, Merdeka 118 Cafe, Cacao Mixology & Chocolate
71 - 74	Middle Zone Offices (Maybank Headquarters)
66 - 70	Middle Zone Offices (Maybank Headquarters)
61 - 65	Middle Zone Offices (Maybank Headquarters)
56 - 60	Middle Zone Offices (Maybank Headquarters)
51 - 55	Middle Zone Offices (Maybank Headquarters)
46 - 50	Middle Zone Offices (Maybank Headquarters)
43 - 45	Middle Zone Offices (Maybank Headquarters)
41M - 42	Mechanical layer 3
40 - 41	Middle Zone Office Sky Lobbies / Maybank Office Lobbies
36 - 39	Low Zone Offices
31 - 35	Low Zone Offices
26 - 30	Low Zone Offices
21 - 25	Low Zone Offices
16 - 20	Low Zone Offices
11 - 15	Low Zone Offices
8 - 10	Low Zone Offices
6 - 7	Mechanical layer 2
5 (M)	Merdeka 118 Upper Lobbies, 118 Mall, Low Zone Office Lobbies, 118 Sudu & Stories Restaurant & Cafe
4 (G)	South Foyer (Minangkabau Lobby) Entrance, Lower Zone Office Lobbies, 118 Mall, Masjid Al-Sultan Abdullah
3 (LGM)	118 Mall, Merdeka 118 Middle Podium, Park Hyatt Hotel Shuttle Elevators Entrance, Stadium Merdeka
2 (C)	Little M, 118 Mall, Park Hyatt Hotel Entrance, Observatory Deck Exit, Masjid Al-Sultan Abdullah
1 (LG)	North Foyer Entrance, 118 Mall, Park Hyatt Hotel Entrance, Observatory Deck Entrance
B1 - B2	Merdeka 118 Parking, Service Area
B3 - B5	Merdeka 118 Parking
B6	Mechanical layer 1

(All of the floor plans and its level arrangements were obtained from the building's proposals and may be subject to change.)

== Height ==
The height of the spire, crown, roof, top floor, observation and residential towers of Merdeka 118.

Height information	Height
Architectural	678.9 m (2,227 ft)
Tip	680.5 m (2,233 ft)
Spire	160.7 m (527 ft)
Roof	518.2 m (1,700 ft)
Top floor	502.8 m (1,650 ft)
Observation	566 m (1,857 ft) and 500 m (1,600 ft)
Merdeka Residential Tower 1	242.3 m (795 ft)
Merdeka Residential Tower 2	220.4 m (723 ft)

== Progress ==
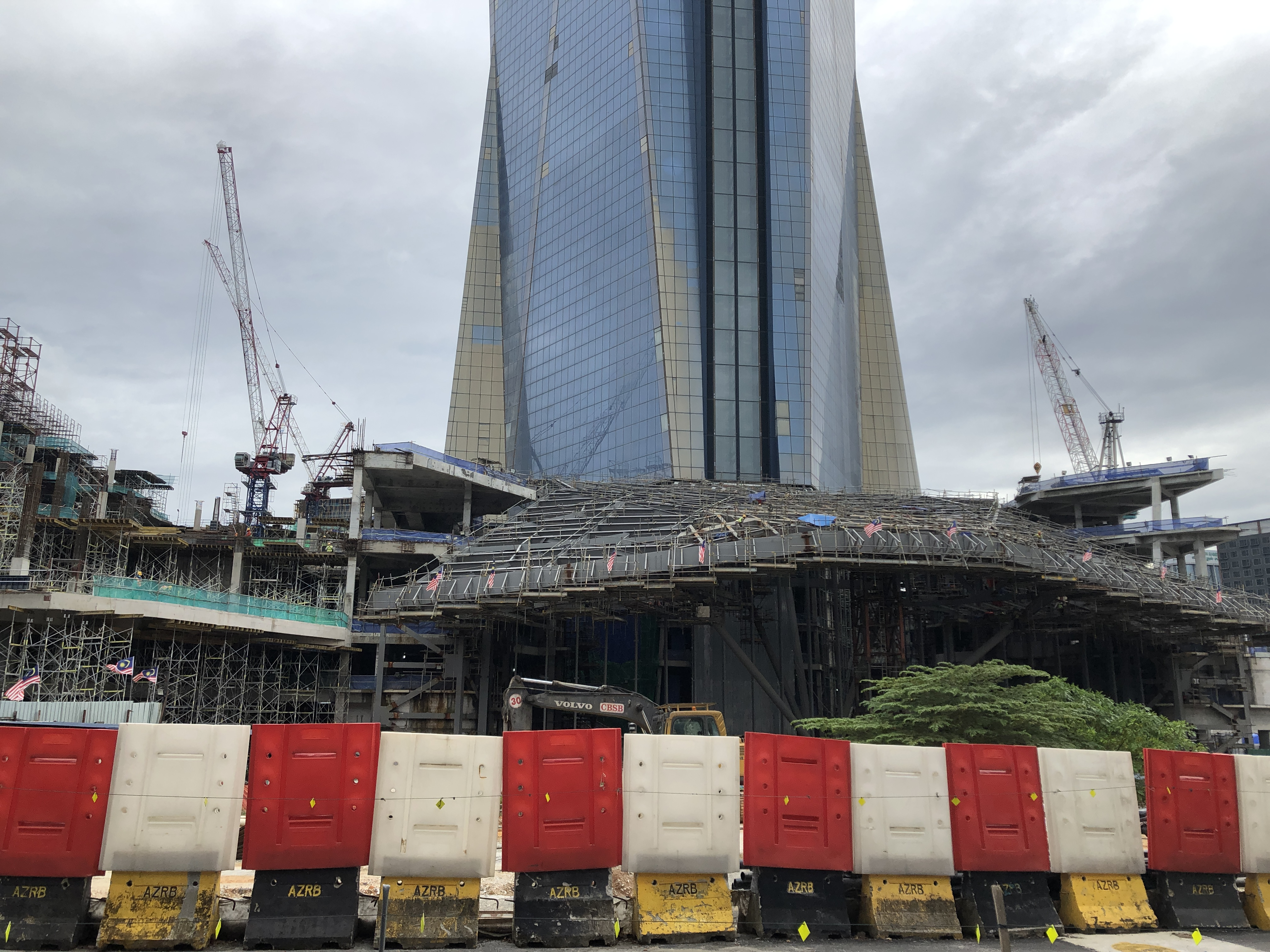
Construction of the tower's base as viewed from Jalan Hang Jebat in September 2021

The piling and foundation work for the project was awarded to Pintaras Geotechnics Sdn Bhd. The Permodalan Nasional Berhad shortlisted six groups for various construction jobs: Samsung C&T and UEM Group Bhd; IJM Corp Bhd, Norwest Holdings Sdn Bhd, and Shimizu Corp; Malaysian Resources Corp Bhd and State Construction Engineering Corp; WCT Bhd and Arabtec Construction LLC; TSR Capital Bhd and Daewoo Group; Seacera Group Bhd with Spaz Sdn Bhd, Sinohydro Corp, and Shanghai Construction Group. These companies submitted their bids by 28 January 2015. KONE, a Finnish group, is supplying around 87 elevators and escalators for the project.

On 23 November 2015, PNB announced a contract worth RM3.4 billion has been awarded to the joint venture of South Korea's Samsung C&T and UEM Group Berhad. Furthermore, on 9 November 2017, PNB planned to raise up to RM5 billion fund for its project via a green sukuk, the Merdeka Asean Green SRI Sukuk, with a 15-year tenure. The sukuk covered the development of its 83-storey office space, which forms part of the tower. It is the first adopter of the Asean Green Bond Standards launched by the Securities Commission Malaysia that validates PNB commitment to develop the project as a sustainable and environmentally-friendly project.

On 27 February 2018, it was announced that Park Hyatt will open up a hotel in Merdeka 118. The Park Hyatt Kuala Lumpur will occupy the top 17 floors of the building; It is slated to have 232 units, including 28 suites and 30 apartments. The construction was halted on 18 March 2020 due to the Movement Control Order in Malaysia caused by the COVID-19 pandemic in the country, but works resumed in mid-May 2020. In early August 2020, the building's concrete core topped out at 118 floors surpassing the Vincom Landmark 81 as the tallest building in Southeast Asia.

In June 2021, the tower was at 81% completion, with the installation of the glass façade in progress at Level 108 and has successfully reached Level 118 with its spire already 50% assembled along with the retail podium. Turner International plays the role of Project Management Consultant for this complex development. The tower was topped out in November 2021. On 10 January 2024, Yang di-Pertuan Agong Al-Sultan Abdullah officially inaugurated Merdeka 118, stated that the new landmark "symbolises the people celebrating the diversity of the country as an independent nation".

On 2 March 2025, the 1 km-long Belfield Tunnel linking to the underground carpark area of Merdeka 118 was officially opened. The two-storey tunnel can be accessed via Jalan Syed Putra and Jalan Damansara, while vehicles leaving Merdeka 118 through the tunnel exit onto Jalan Syed Putra and Jalan Istana. The tunnel will also serve visitors to Park Hyatt Kuala Lumpur and 118 Mall, set to open in the second quarter of 2025 and by June 2026, respectively.

On 28 July 2026, the tower was officially renamed as Menara Merdeka Maybank (Merdeka Maybank Tower) to reflect the presence of its anchor tenant, Maybank, which had relocated its headquarters into the building. Meanwhile the name of the surrounding precinct remains as Merdeka 118 Precinct.

== Trespassing incidents ==
In 2022, a viral video began circulating online when a group of American individuals trespassed towards the top of Merdeka 118, prompting criticism of the lack of security measures at the site. In a statement, the developer stated that such stunts are illegal and that trespassing is illegal by law. The group was eventually charged under Section 457 of the Malaysian Penal Code.

That same year, another trespassing incident occurred when Russian rooftoppers Angela Nikolau and Ivan Beerkus scaled the spire of Merdeka 118, prompting further criticism. Malaysian police requested for the entry and exit records of the couple from the Malaysian Immigration Department, which responded that there were no records of the duo entering or exiting Malaysia, suggesting that they had entered the country illegally. Home Minister Saifuddin Nasution Ismail has confirmed that a full investigation is ongoing.

== Notable events ==
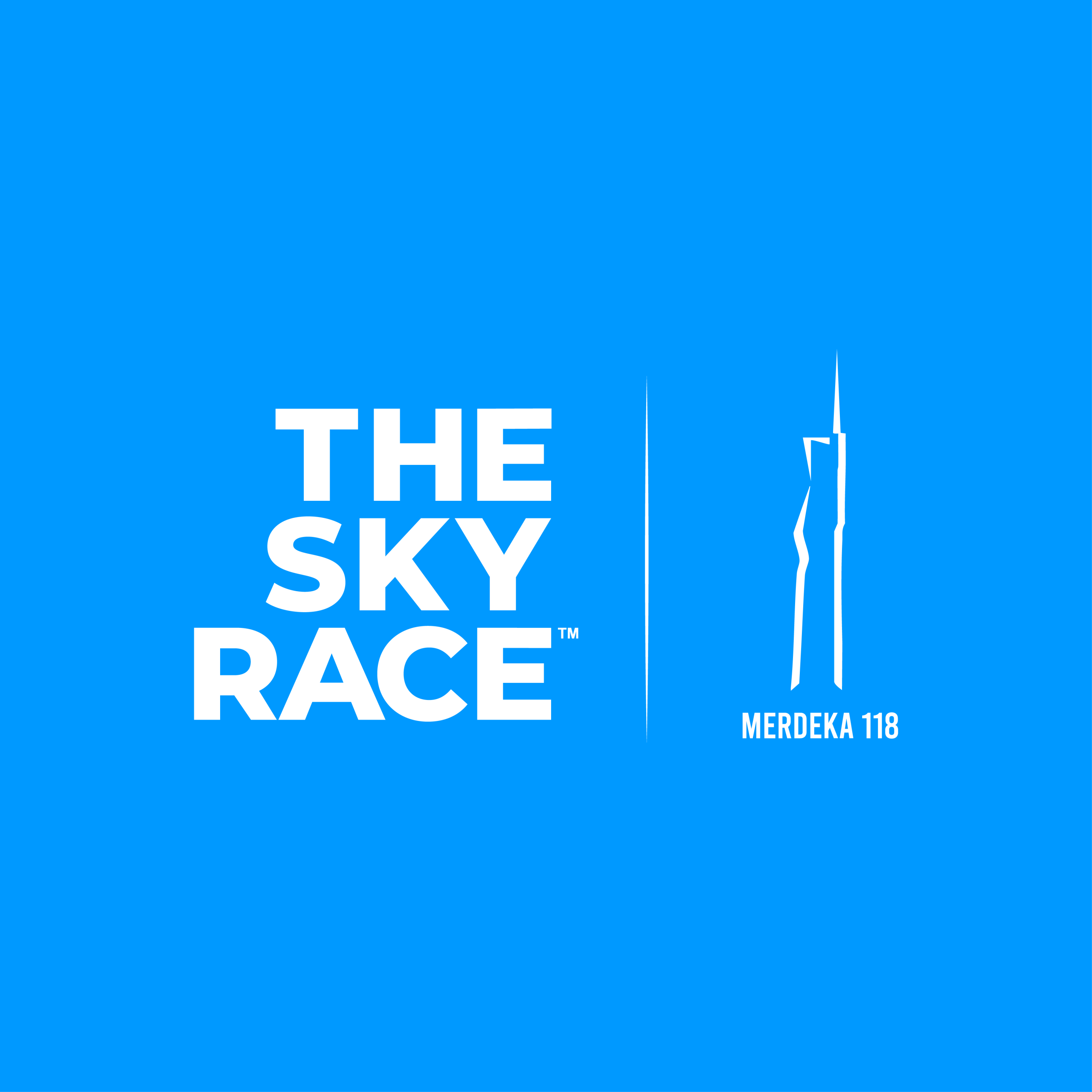
The Sky Race event logo

=== The Sky Race ===
Merdeka 118 hosted its first-ever tower-running event, The Sky Race. Organized by Fresh Events Asia in collaboration with the Malaysia Towerrunning Association, the event coincided with the 3rd Towerrunning Asian & Oceanian Championships.. The challenge involved ascending 2,845 steps from the ground floor up to Level 118, which was not normally open to the public.

The first edition was held on 30 August 2025, with more than 5,800 participants from about 70 countries registered for the event. Following the success of the first tower-running event, the second edition was held on 22 and 23 August 2026, with 8,000 participants from about 78 countries registered, established a record for the largest participation in a tower-running event in the Malaysia Book of Records.

== Gallery ==
=== Outside ===
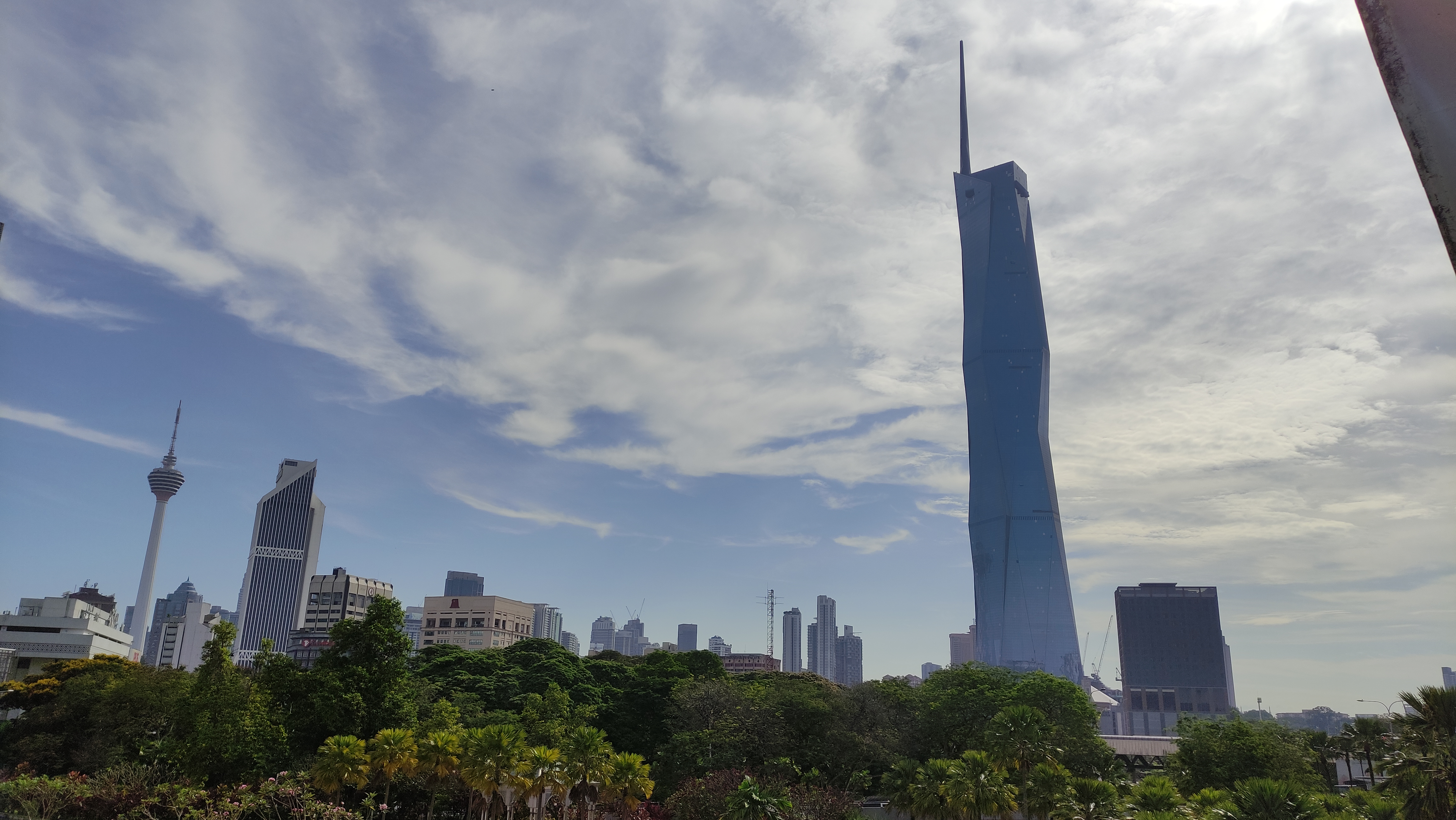
The Merdeka 118 alongside the KL Tower on its left

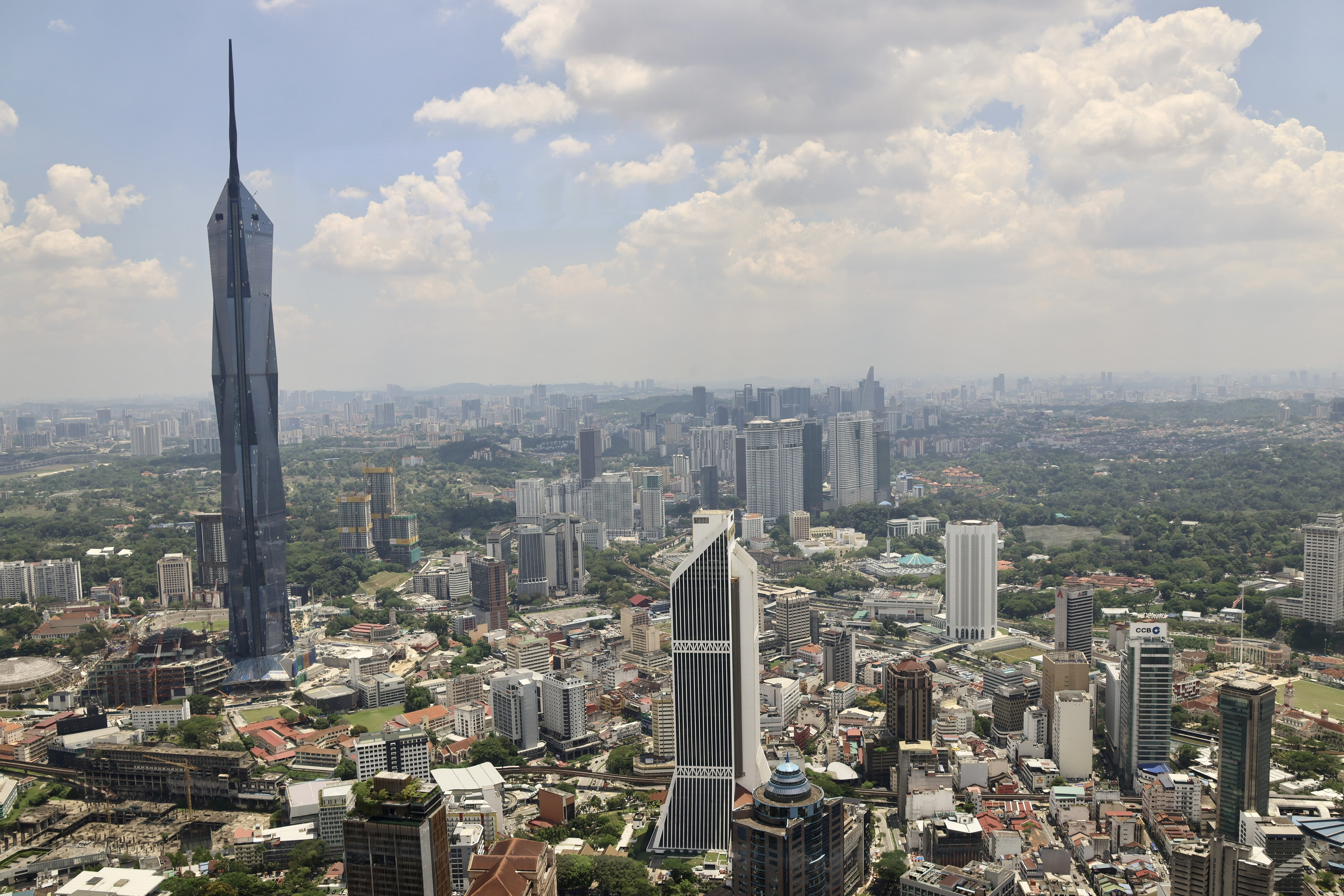
As seen from Kuala Lumpur Tower

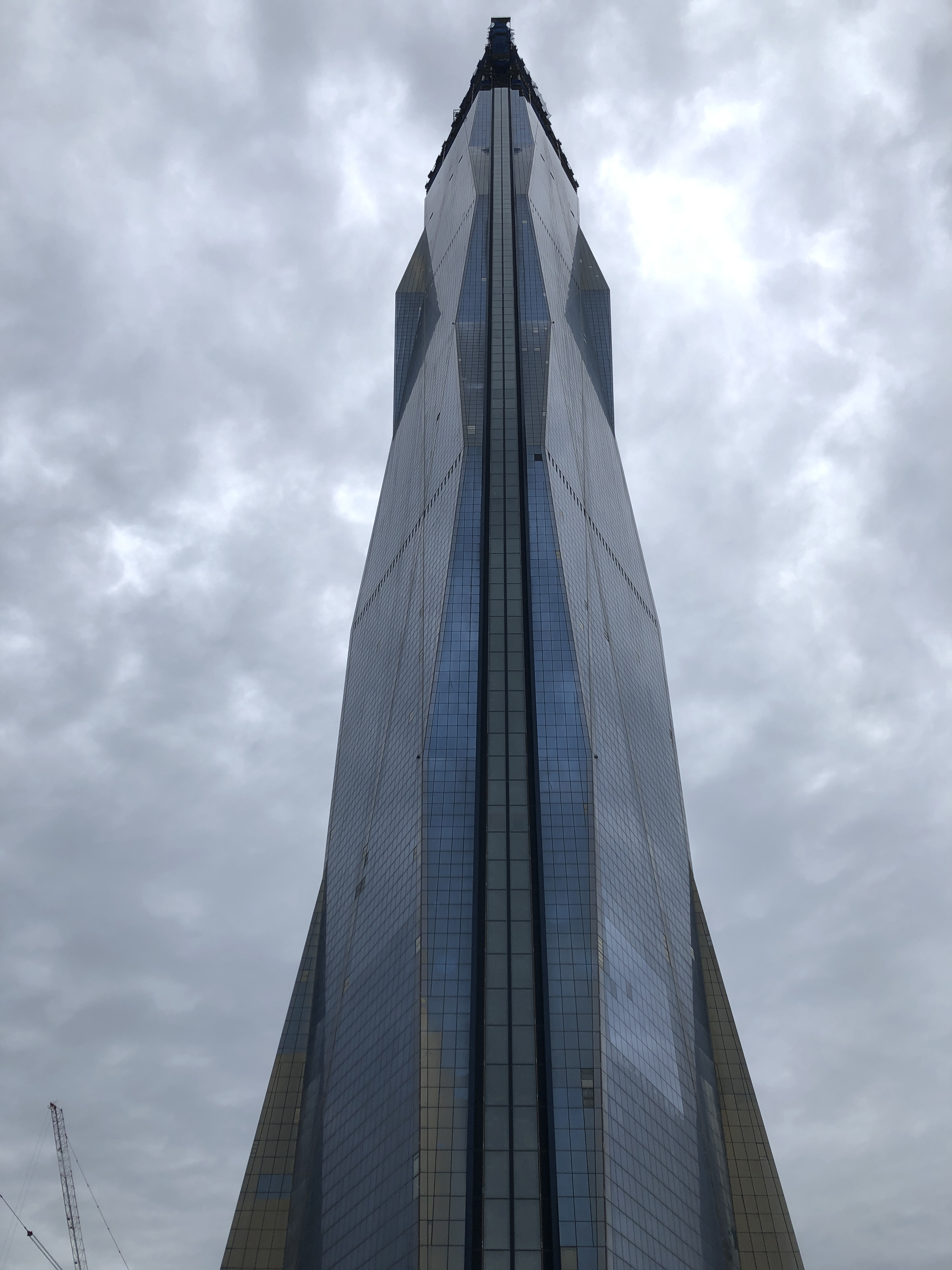
The glass elevator shaft in the middle

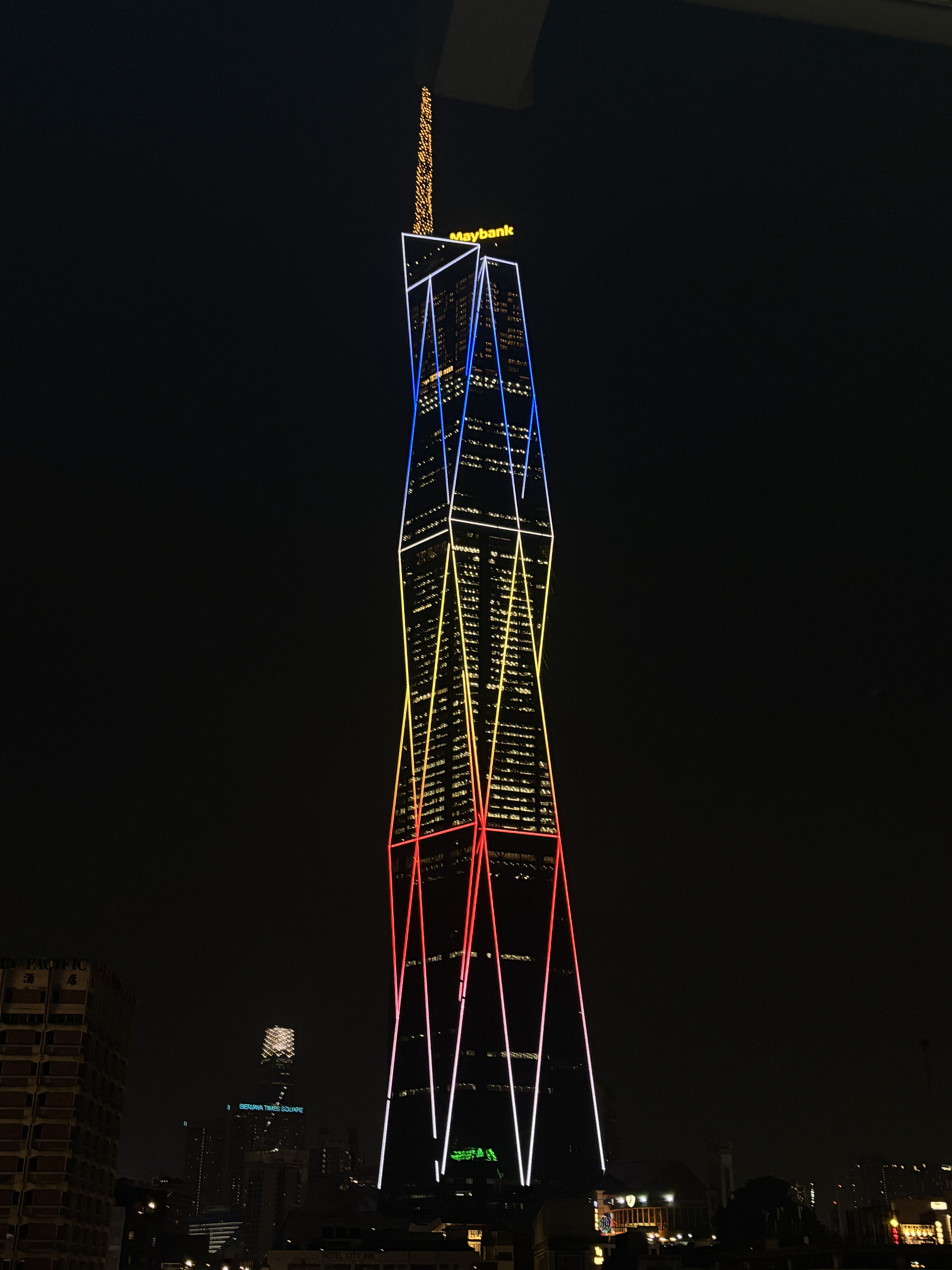
LED light display

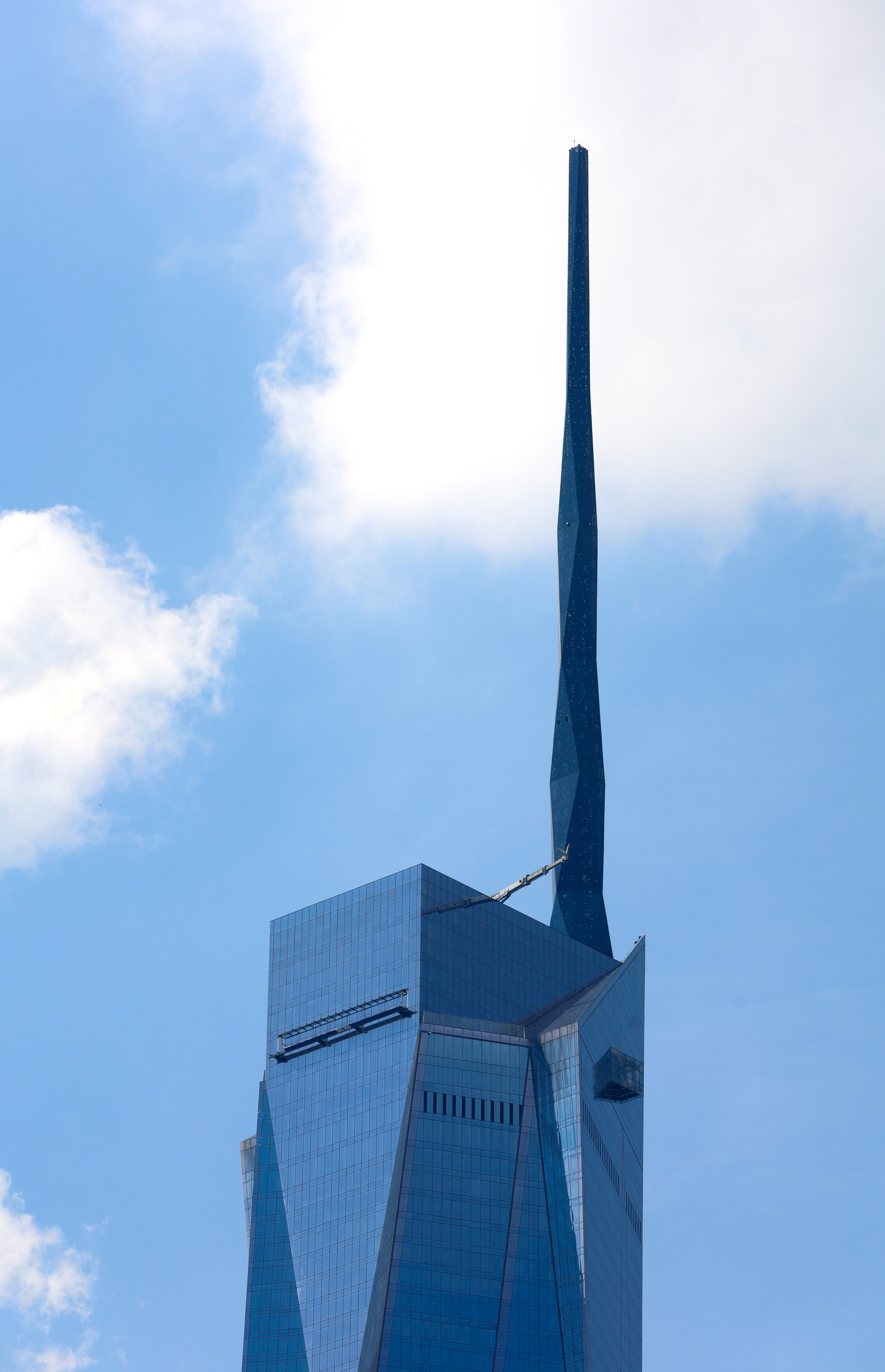
The top of the tower

Shot from Petaling Street

=== Inside ===
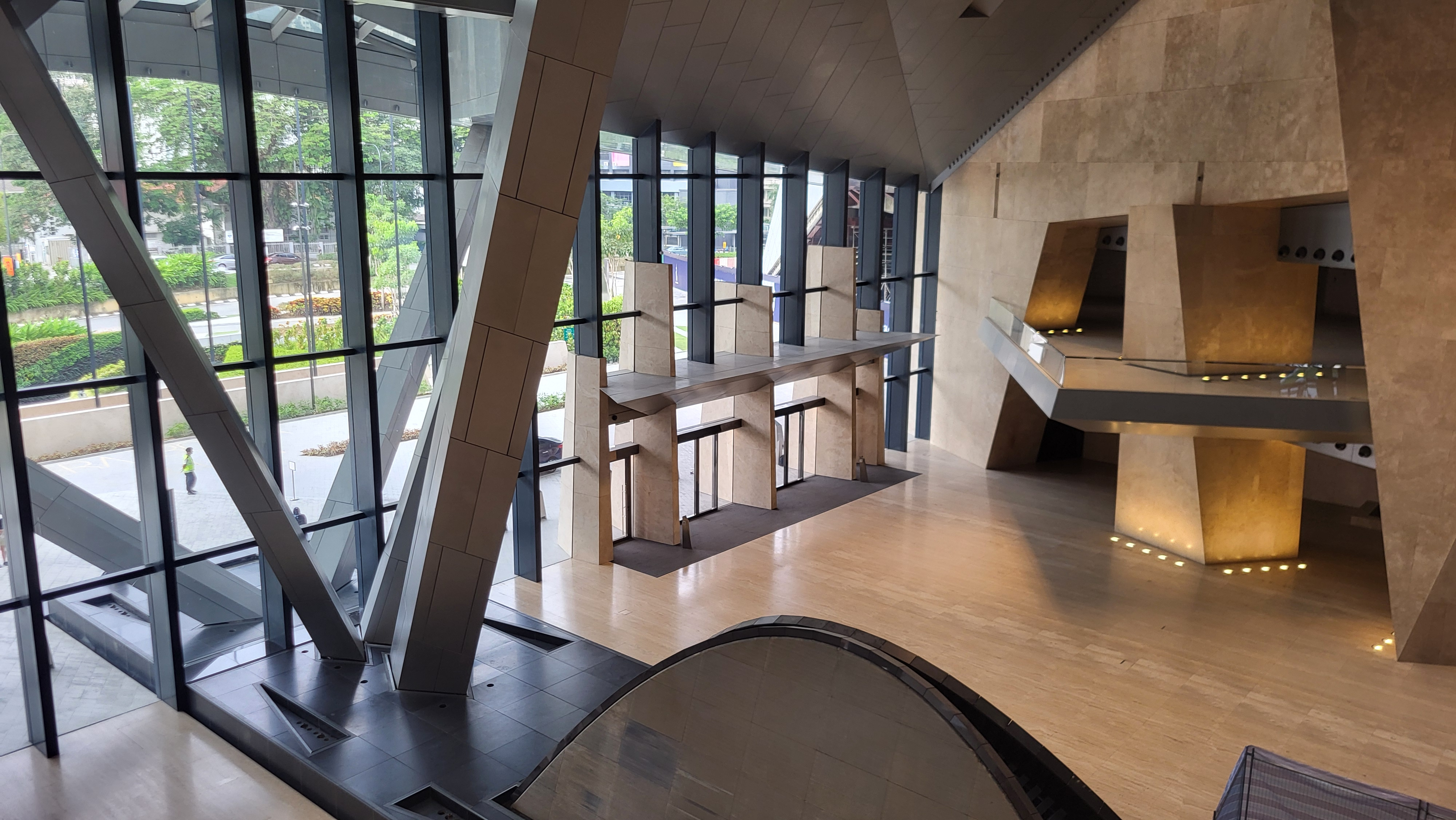
North foyer

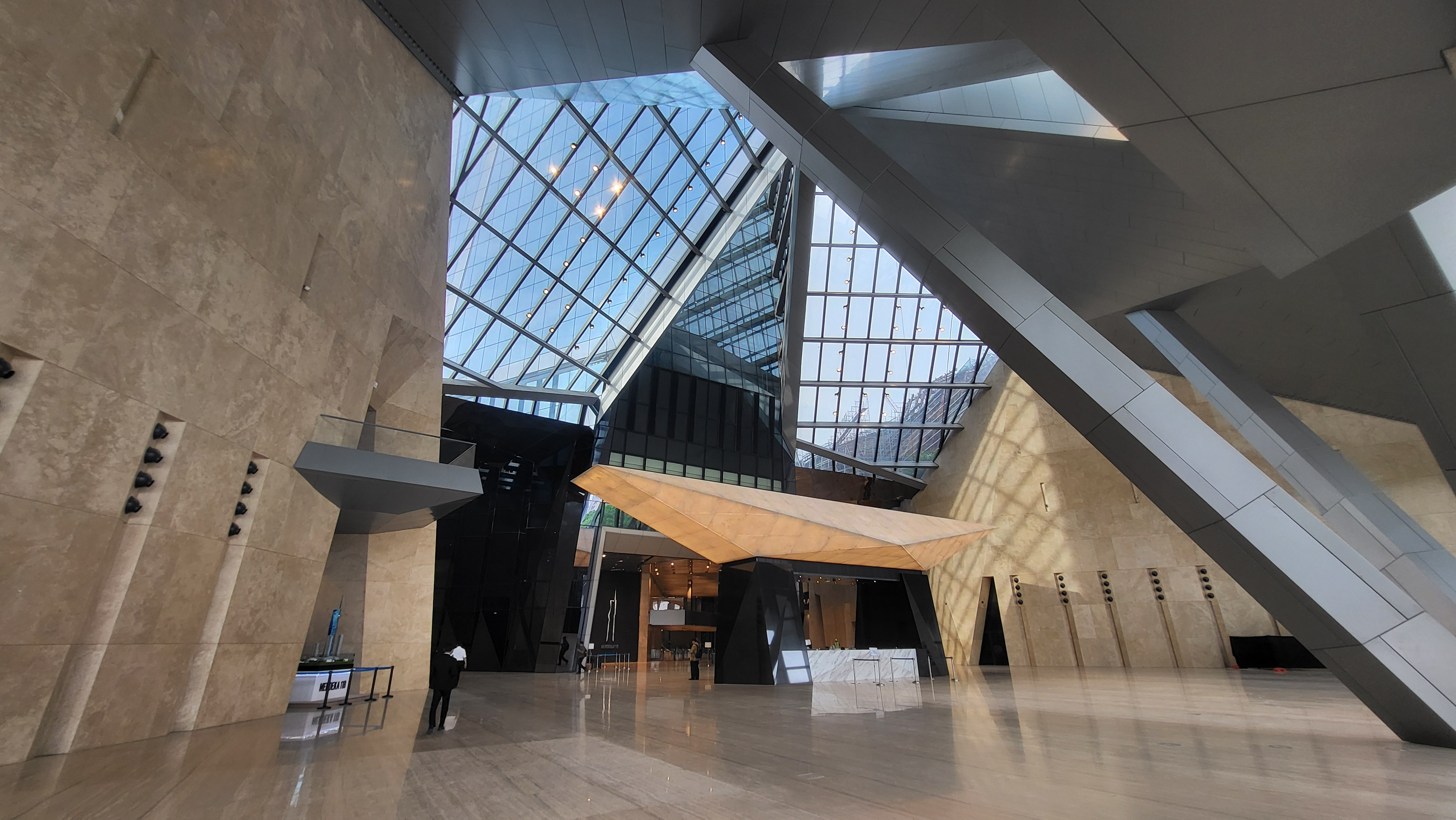
South foyer

=== Construction ===
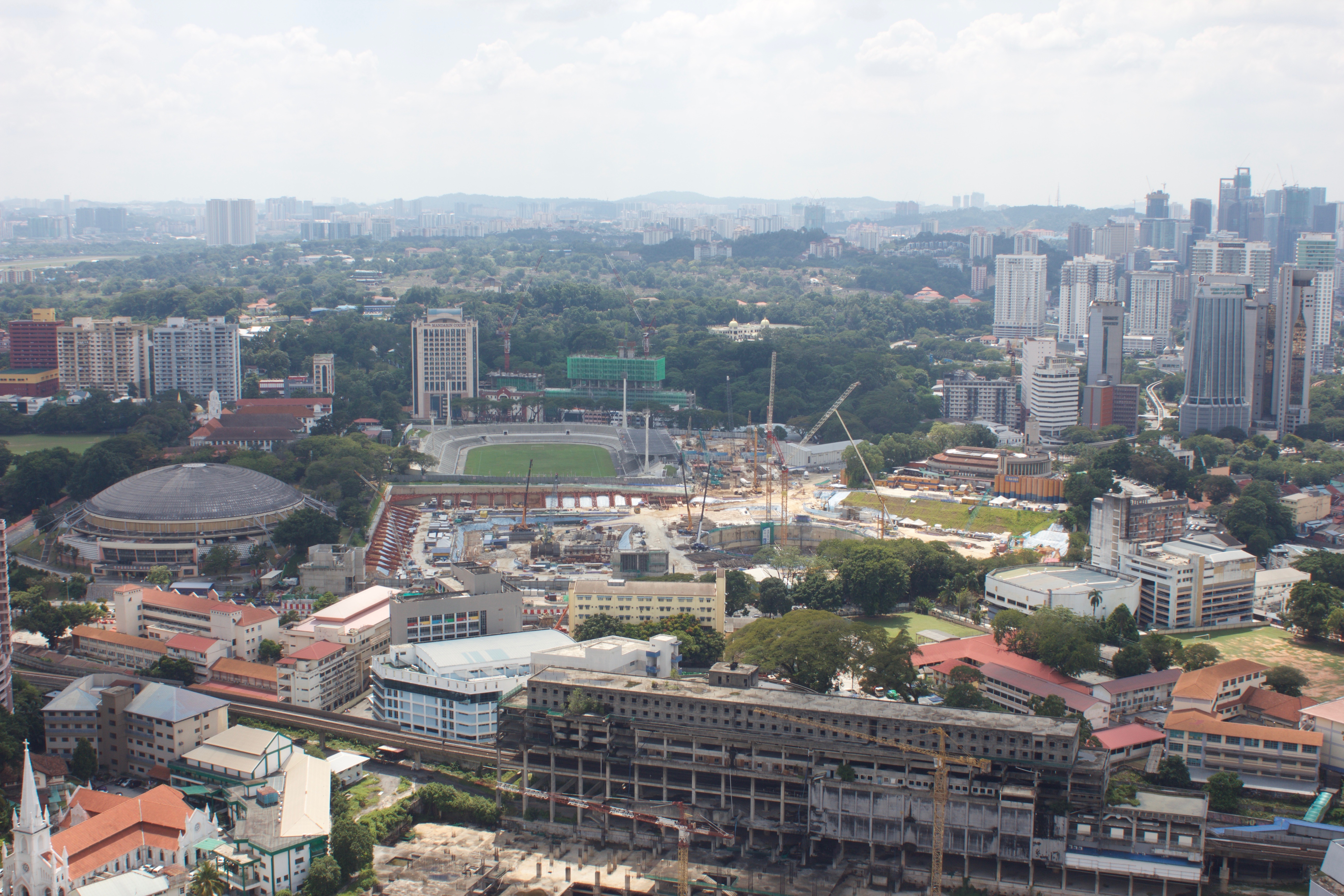
Foundation works, 2016

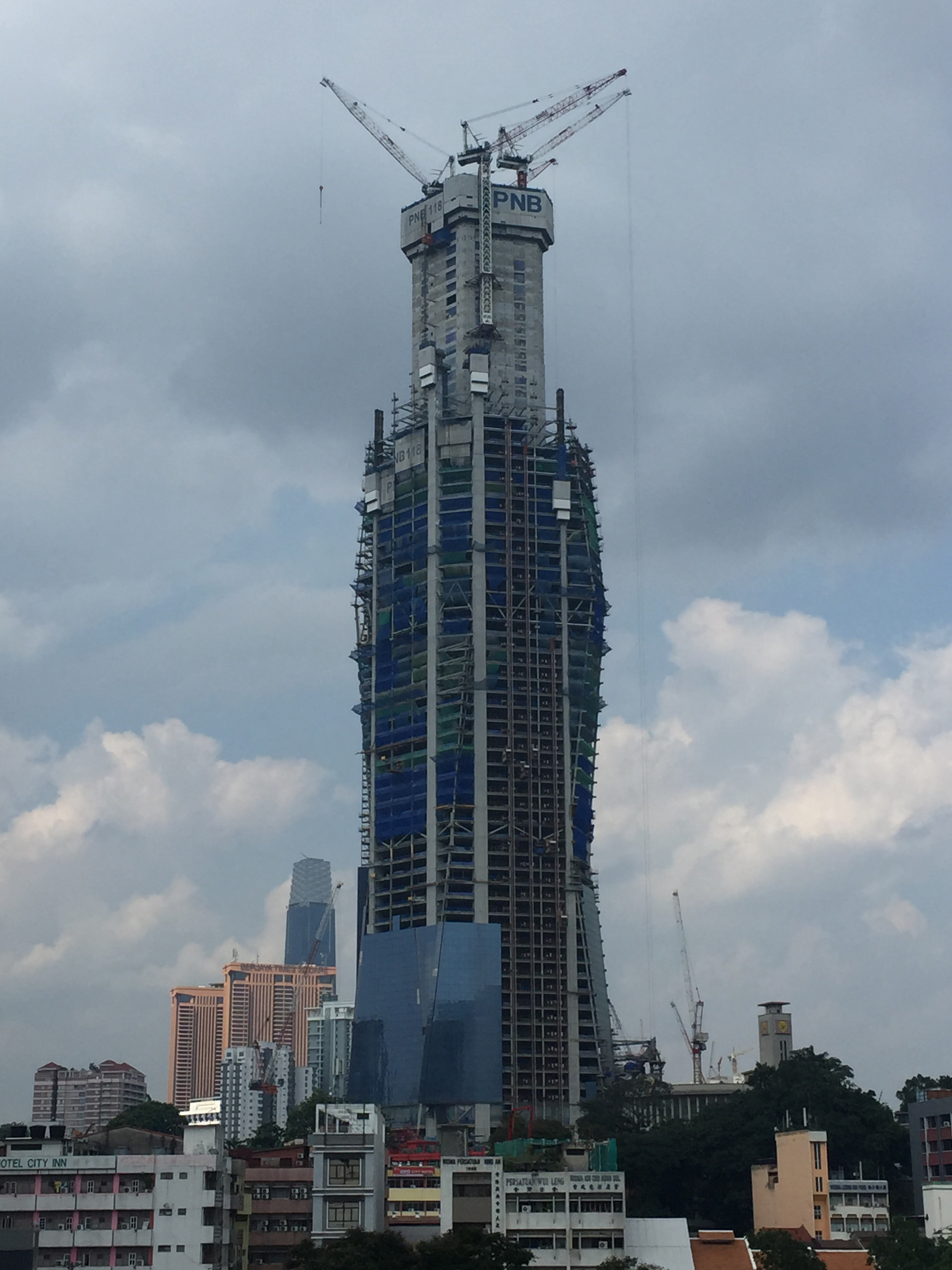
July 2019

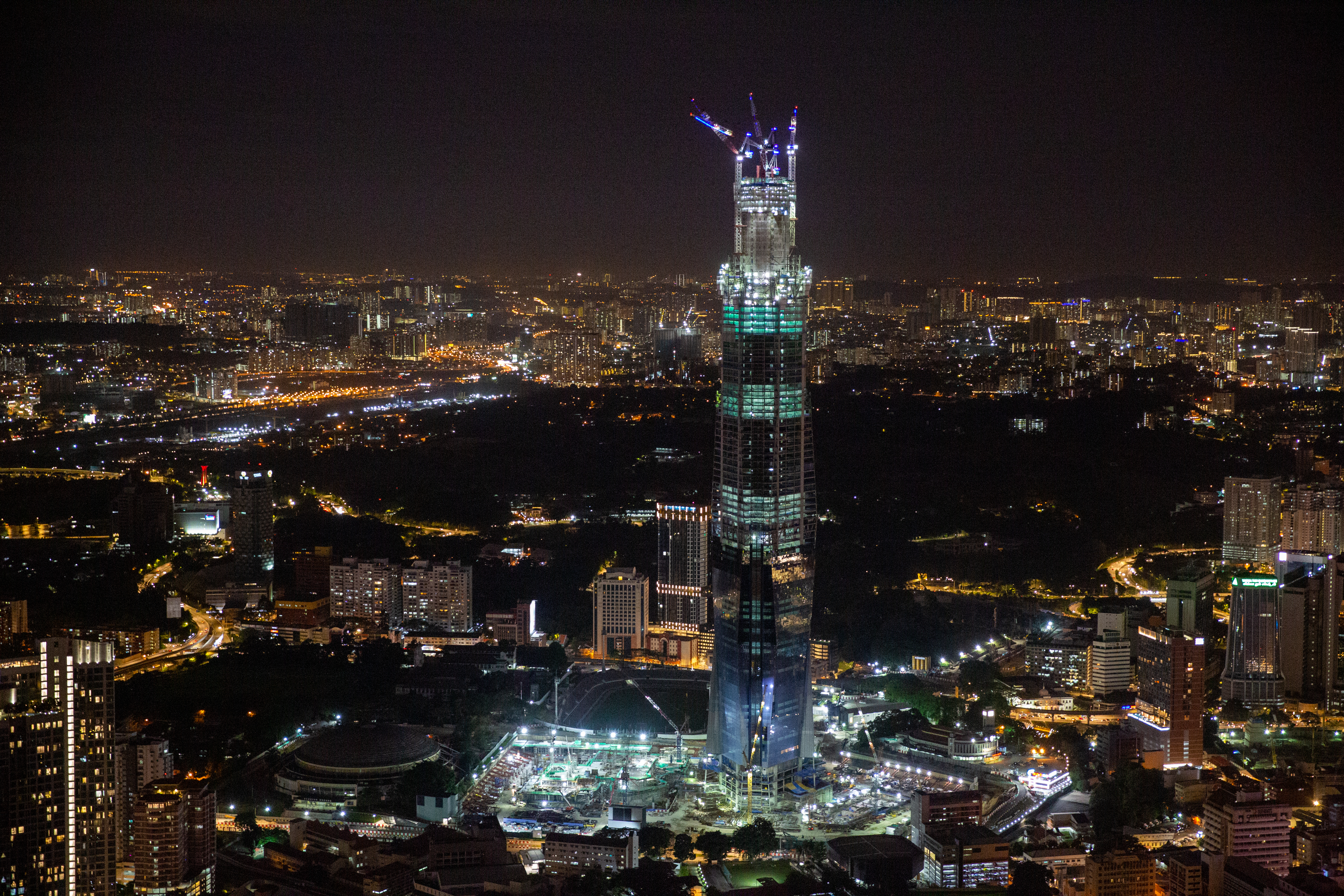
At night, November 2019

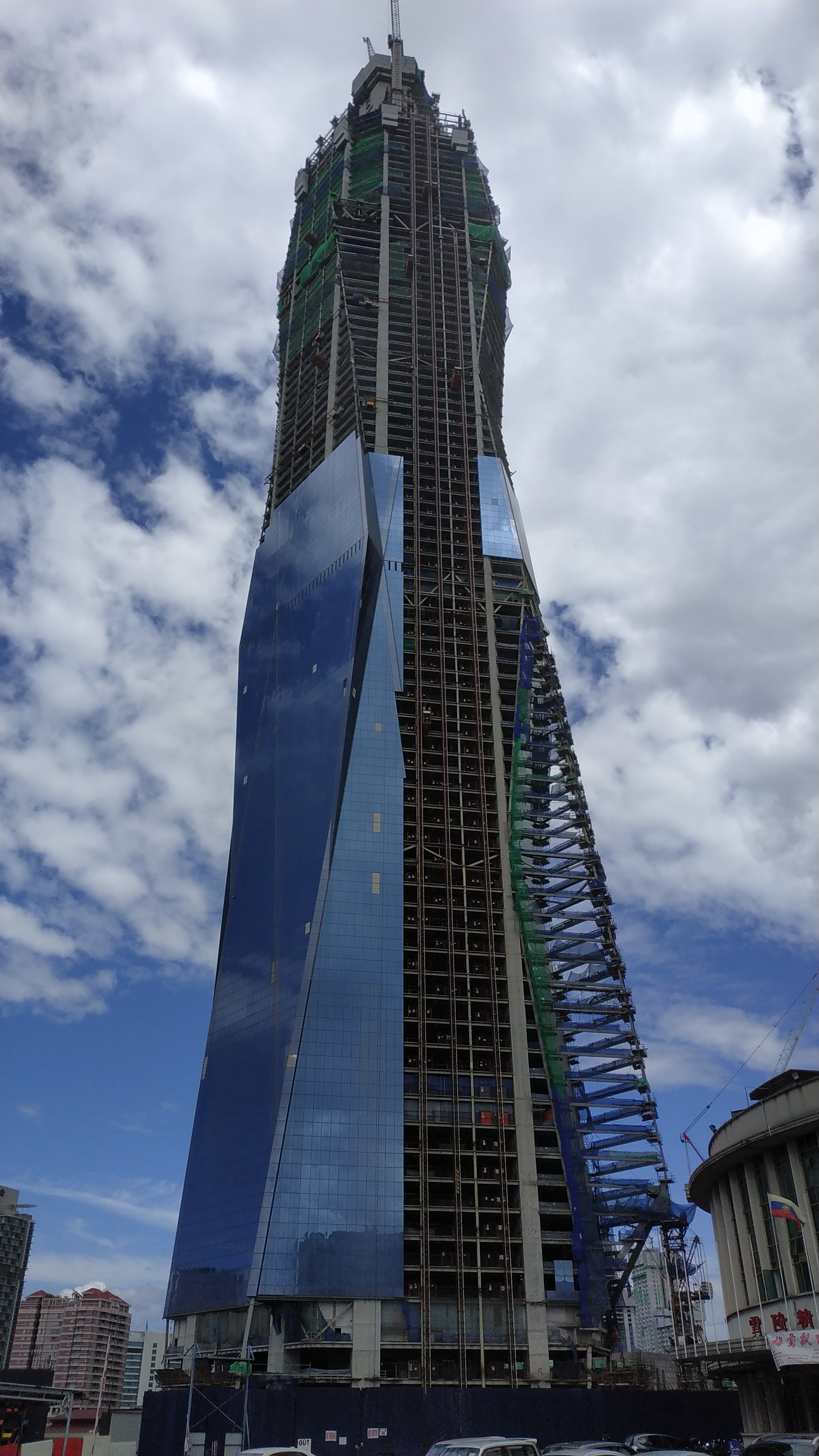
February 2020

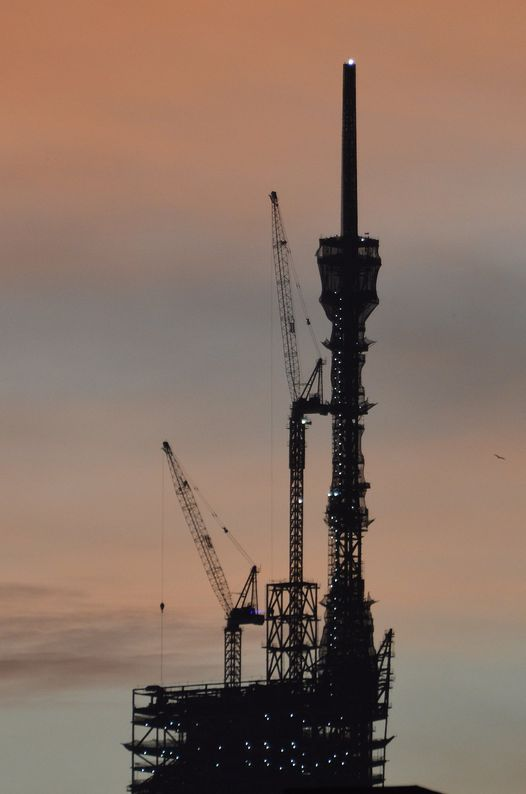
Almost completed spire, November 2021

== See also ==
- Bandar Malaysia
- List of buildings with 100 floors or more
- List of tallest buildings
- List of tallest buildings in Asia
- List of tallest buildings in Southeast Asia
- List of tallest buildings in Kuala Lumpur
- List of tallest buildings in Malaysia
- List of tallest structures
- Malaysian National Projects
- Petronas Twin Towers
- Tower M
- Tradewinds Square Tower
- Burj Khalifa
- TRX
- Vanity height
