= Ivan Beerkus =

Russian rooftopper and blogger (born 1994)

- Born: Ivan Artemovich Kuznetsov; 11 May 1994 (age 32); Moscow, Russia
- Occupations: Blogger, rooftopper, urban climber
- Known for: Scaling skyscrapers
- Partner(s): Angela Nikolau (2016–present; engaged)

Ivan Beerkus (born Ivan Artemovich Kuznetsov; 11 May 1994) is a Russian rooftopper, urban climber and blogger. Beerkus has ascended the Eiffel Tower in Paris, the Main Building of Moscow State University, Shun Hing Square in Shenzhen, China, Mercury City Tower in Moscow, Shanghai Tower in Shanghai, the CTF Financial Centre building in Guangzhou, China, Goldin Finance 117 in Tianjin, China, and the second-tallest building in the world, Merdeka 118 in Malaysia.

== Rooftopping and urban climbing ==
In 2016, he and Angela Nikolau climbed Goldin Finance 117 in Tianjin and the construction crane at the top of the tower.

In 2022, Beerkus and Angela Nikolau scaled the rooftop of the Malaysian skyscraper Merdeka 118, the second-tallest building in the world. This event received extensive coverage from media worldwide, and videos on Instagram reached 8.6 million views.

=== 2026 Empire State Building climb ===
On 1 July 2026, Beerkus and fellow rooftopper Angela Nikolau climbed the spire of the Empire State Building in New York City. During the climb, the pair unfurled a banner bearing the message, "When the power of love beats the love of power, the world knows peace." The quote is often misattributed to the rock guitarist Jimi Hendrix, but actually spoken by the British politician William Gladstone. While descending the spire, Beerkus appeared to propose marriage to Nikolau, and she accepted. Following the climb, both were arrested by the New York City Police.

== Awards ==
In 2013, he received the top prize in the Best of Russia photo contest under the category "People. Events. Life.".

== In media ==
In 2024, the film Skywalkers: A Love Story, featuring Beerkus and Nikolau, premiered at the Sundance Film Festival. Later, Netflix acquired the rights to the film.
