= Red Bull TV =

Online television channel

Red Bull TV is an online television channel owned by Red Bull GmbH. Programming content focuses on live events and shows related to sports, music, lifestyle, and culture. The channel runs long-format original programming series.

Series include Sky Trippers, which follows three friends as they pilot paramotors through Vietnam, Cambodia, Thailand and Malaysia, and URBEX – Enter At Your Own Risk, a documentary series that explores urban exploration, and Screenland, a series about video game design.

The channel also features short-format series, such as Sheckler Sessions, which stars professional skateboarder Ryan Sheckler, and Who is J.O.B., featuring pro surfer Jamie O'Brien. Red Bull TV provides live coverage of sports events such as the UCI Mountain Bike World Cup and the Wings for Life World Run, as well as broadcasting music festivals like Bonnaroo, Lollapalooza, and Austin City Limits. On January 23, 2025, Red Bull TV broadcast KASSO, which was the Japanese skateboarding gameshow that produced by TBS Television, which was well-known for several famous sports gameshows such as Takeshi's Castle, Sasuke, Kunoichi, Kinniku Banzuke and Sports Danshi Grand Prix.
