= Rooftopping =

Climbing of rooftops and other high objects

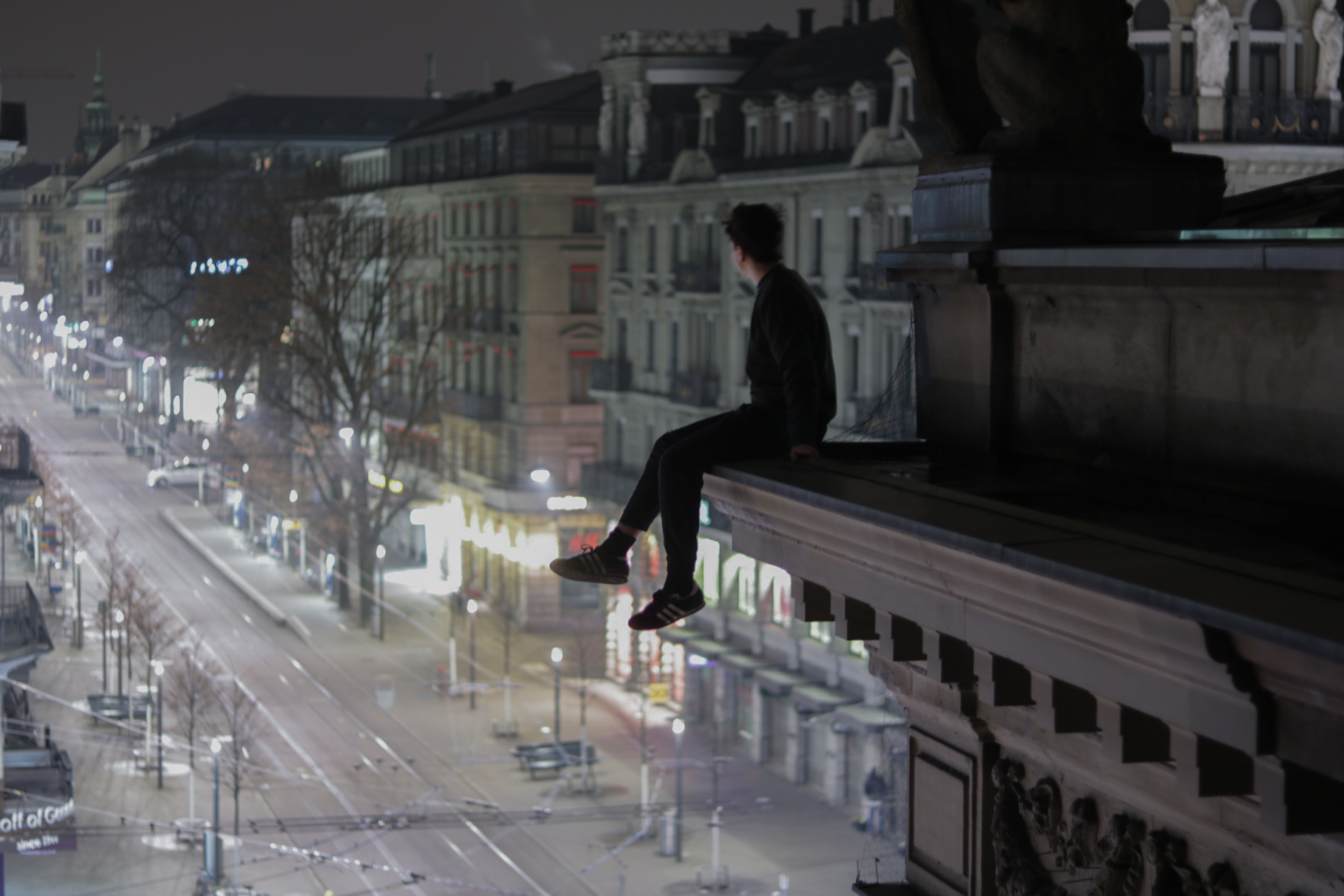
A rooftopper on top of the Zürich Hauptbahnhof railway station in Switzerland

Buildering and rooftopping on a cable-stayed bridge in Kyiv, Ukraine

Rooftopping, sometimes called roofing, refers to the (typically illegal) unsecured ascent of rooftops, skyscrapers, towers, cranes, antennas, smokestacks, or other tall structures. Rooftoppers usually take photos or videos of their climbs. The practice of scaling skyscrapers often results in security crackdowns and arrests. Many people have died or been injured when falling while rooftopping. The activity is closely related to the activity of urban climbing (or buildering).

== Activity ==
Rooftopping is an activity primarily undertaken by younger people. While similar in some ways to buildering (climbing the outside of buildings), it typically involves gaining roof access from within the building using stairs and/or ladders up to a roof access door or hatch.

Rooftopping is a subset of urban exploration and urban climbing and is generally illegal, often requiring trespassing and bypassing locked doors.

Rooftoppers usually take videos and panoramic photographs, either by themselves or with the help of a crew of assistants or accomplices who may be present on the climb or filming from a distance. Video footage is typically taken using helmet cameras. Quadcopter drones may also be used, both for pre-climb exploration and for recording the act itself. Because it is often practiced in pursuit of making video or photo content, rooftopping tends to provoke heightened security and greater restriction of access to desirable exploration sites after said content is published.

== Popularity ==
In one report presented to American Educational Research Association in 1995 participants were suggested as thrill seekers who enjoy "high levels of stimulation and complexity of thinking," although other theories explaining their motivation exist.

There was a rooftopping "craze" in Russia around 2017.

== Notable rooftoppers ==
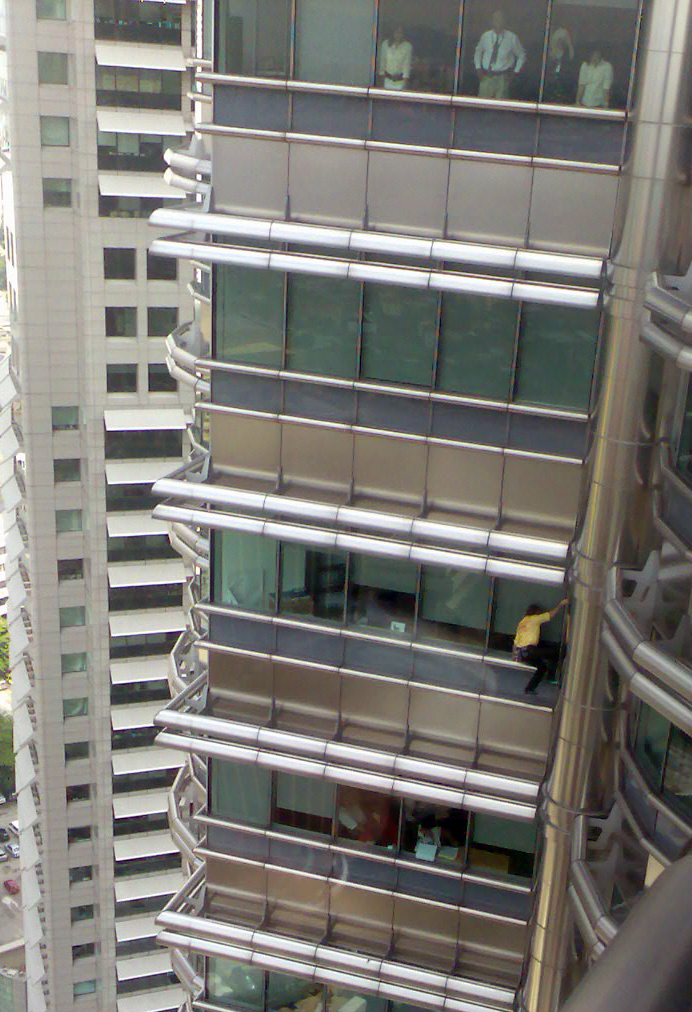
Alain Robert climbing Petronas Tower 2 in March 2007

- Ally Law, English YouTuber who makes rooftopping videos.
- Mustang Wanted, real name Pavlo Ushivets, a Ukrainian rooftopper who has performed climbs and stunts around the world. In August 2014, during the War in Donbas, he climbed the spire of Kotelnicheskaya Embankment Building in Moscow, Russia, and painted the yellow star on the top of the spire blue to symbolize the colors of the Ukrainian flag. He was later prosecuted in absentia in Russia for vandalism; meanwhile he was protected and rewarded by Ukraine.
- Angela Nikolau, a Russian rooftopper and model.
- Ivan Beerkus, a Russian rooftopper. Beerkus and Angela Nikolau accessed the Empire State Building's off-limits 103rd floor without permission and scaled the transmission tower on July 1, 2026. Beerkus proposed to Nikolau at the top of the spire and the duo posted pictures of their climb on Instagram before descending, after which they were arrested by the NYPD.
- Kirill Oreshkin, the Moscow-based "Russian Spider-Man." He has published pictures of himself in the midst of dangerous stunts on some of Russia's tallest buildings. Oreshkin started scaling buildings as a hobby in 2008. Videos of his ascents have been posted on YouTube.
- Vitaliy Raskalov and Vadim Makhorov, YouTube rooftoppers.
- Vic Invades, New York urban explorer.
- Tom Ryaboi, a Canadian photographer who has been credited as a pioneer in the community. His photo "I'll Make You Famous" in 2011 has been cited as the first rooftopping image to go viral.
- Justin Casquejo, an American who has scaled several skyscrapers in Manhattan, New York City, as well as a water tower in his hometown of Weehawken, New Jersey.
- Alain Robert, a French climber nicknamed "the French Spider-Man" who has free-climbed numerous skyscrapers around the world.

=== Deaths ===
- Wu Yongning, known as "the Chinese Superman." He died in 2017 while performing a rooftopping stunt.
- Remi Lucidi, a.k.a. Remi Enigma, a 30-year-old French daredevil and photographer known for climbing skyscrapers. He fell to his death from the 68th floor of Tregunter Towers in Hong Kong in 2023.

== See also ==
- Free solo climbing
- List of selfie-related injuries and deaths
- Modern ruins
- Roof and tunnel hacking
- Ruins photography
- Unfinished building
- Urban exploration
